This is a list of composers who have written symphonies, listed in chronological order by year of birth, alphabetical within year. It includes only composers of significant fame, notability or importance who have Wikipedia articles. For lists of music composers by other classifications, see Lists of composers.

1650–1699 
Antonio Caldara (1670–1736), Italian composer of a dozen sinfonie.
Tomaso Albinoni (1671–1751), Italian violinist, singer, and composer of eight sinfonie
Giovanni Porta (c. 1675–1755), Italian composer of a sinfonia in D.
Antonio Vivaldi (1678–1741), Italian violinist, teacher, cleric, and composer of 21 string sinfonie
Christoph Graupner (1683–1760), German composer of at least 113 symphonies
Giuseppe Matteo Alberti (1684–1751), Italian composer of the Sinfonia Teatrale.
Francesco Manfredini (1684–1762), Italian composer of numerous sinfonie.
Domenico Scarlatti (1685–1757), Italian composer famous for keyboard sonatas but also a writer of sinfonie for strings.
Benedetto Marcello (1686–1739), Italian composer of 7 sinfonie
Johann Friedrich Fasch (1688–1758), German violinist and composer of at least 19 symphonies for strings
Giuseppe Antonio Brescianello (c. 1690–1758), Italian composer of at least 6 symphonies
Giovanni Antonio Giay (1690–1764), Italian composer of 5 symphonies
Leonardo Vinci (1690–1730), Italian composer known for opera, but writer of a sinfonia for strings.
Giuseppe Tartini (1692–1770), Italian composer of a sinfonia in A.
Christoph Förster (1693–1745), German composer of at least 15 symphonies
Johan Helmich Roman (1694–1758), Swedish composer of at least 21 symphonies
Johann Melchior Molter (1696–1765), German composer of more than 140 symphonies
Andrea Zani (1696–1757), Italian violinist and composer of the earliest securely dated symphonies (part of his Op. 2, published in 1729)
Johann Adolph Hasse (1699–1783), German singer, teacher, and composer of six symphonies

1700–1749 
Giovanni Battista Sammartini (c. 1701–1775), Italian oboist, organist, choirmaster, teacher, and composer of at least 67 symphonies (often confused with his brother, Giuseppe Sammartini, who did not compose any symphonies)
Johan Agrell (1701–1765), German-Swedish composer of at least 22 symphonies
Johann Gottlieb Graun (1703–1771), German violinist and composer of about 100 symphonies
Carl Heinrich Graun (1704–1759), German composer of 1 symphony
Carlos Seixas (1704–1742), Portuguese composer of at least 3 symphonies
Andrea Bernasconi (1706–1784), Italian composer of about 20 symphonies
Antonio Brioschi (fl. c. 1725–1750), Italian composer of at least 26 symphonies
Carl Höckh (1707–1773), German composer of 11 symphonies
Giovanni Battista Martini (1707–1784), Italian composer of 24 symphonies
Johann Gottlieb Janitsch (1708 – c. 1763), Silesian composer of at least 7 symphonies
Johann Adolf Scheibe (1708–1760), German-Danish composer of more than 70 symphonies
Franz Benda (1709–1786), Bohemian composer of 17 symphonies
Franz Xaver Richter (1709–1789), Austro-Moravian singer, violinist, composer, conductor, music theoretician, and composer of at least 69 symphonies
Christoph Schaffrath (1709–1763), German composer of many symphonies
Thomas Arne (1710–1778), British composer of roughly a dozen symphonies originally written as overtures to stage works
Wilhelm Friedemann Bach (1710–1784), Eldest son of Johann Sebastian Bach, and a German composer of 8 symphonies
Giuseppe Bonno (1711–1788), Austrian composer of at least 3 symphonies
William Boyce (1711–1779), English composer whose Op. 2 is a set of 8 "symphonies", although they started life as overtures to other works
Jean-Joseph Cassanéa de Mondonville (1711–1772), French composer of 6 symphonies
Ignaz Holzbauer (1711–1783), Austro-German composer of 69 symphonies
Frederick the Great (1712–1786) King of Prussia, composer of 4 symphonies
Antoine Dauvergne (1713–1797), French composer of 4 symphonies
Johann Ludwig Krebs (1713–1780), German composer of 2 symphonies
Carl Philipp Emanuel Bach (1714–1788), German composer of 17 symphonies, with several more being also attributed to him
Christoph Willibald Gluck (1714–1787), German opera reformer of at least several symphonies
Georg Christoph Wagenseil (1715–1777), Austrian composer of several symphonies
Georg Matthias Monn (1717–1750), composer of the first symphony (1740) with a minuet as the third movement
Johann Stamitz (1717–1757), Czech composer of 58 symphonies, and the first composer to regularly include a minuet as the third movement
Wenzel Raimund Birck (1718–1763), Austrian composer of pre-Classical "sinfonie", as well as a few symphonies of the evolved form
Leopold Mozart (1719–1787), Austrian violinist and composer who wrote symphonies in which he included (natural) French horns
Georg Benda (1722–1795), Czech composer of about 30 symphonies
Carl Friedrich Abel (1723–1787), German viola da gamba virtuoso and composer, later active in London, wrote 43 symphonies, one of which was misattributed in the 19th century to Wolfgang Amadeus Mozart as his Symphony No. 3
Johann Hartmann (1726–1793), Danish composer of 4 symphonies, grandfather of Johan Peter Emilius Hartmann
Johann Wilhelm Hertel (1727–1789), German composer of many symphonies
Florian Leopold Gassmann (1729–1774), German-speaking Bohemian composer of 32 symphonies
Pierre van Maldere (1729–1768), Belgian composer of about 45 symphonies
František Xaver Pokorný (1729–1794), Bohemian composer of about 140 symphonies, 104 of which were deliberately misattributed to other composers in 1796 by Theodor von Schacht
Jean-Baptiste Cardonne (1730–1792), French composer of at least 2 symphonies
Christian Cannabich (1731–1798), German composer of the Mannheim school, who wrote about 70 symphonies
František Xaver Dušek (1731–1799), Czech composer of 37 symphonies
Gaetano Pugnani (1731–1798), Italian violinist and composer of at least 12 symphonies
Johann Christoph Friedrich Bach (1732–1795), of German composer of 28 symphonies, most of which are lost. He was the fifth son of Johann Sebastian Bach.
Joseph Haydn (1732–1809), Austrian composer, one of the best-known Classical composers of symphonies, he wrote 106 examples, combining wit and structural clarity (see the List of symphonies by Joseph Haydn and the Category of Haydn symphonies)
Franz Ignaz von Beecke (1733–1803), German composer of at least 33 symphonies
Anton Fils (1733–1760), German composer who wrote at least 40 symphonies for the Mannheim orchestra
Franz Ignaz Beck (1734–1809), German composer of about 25 symphonies
François-Joseph Gossec (1734–1829), French composer of over 60 symphonies
Karl von Ordoñez (1734–1786), Austrian composer of some 73 symphonies
Luka Sorkočević (1734–1789), Croatian composer of 8 symphonies
Johann Christian Bach (1735–1782), German composer, son of Johann Sebastian Bach, wrote at least 28 symphonies
Ernst Wilhelm Wolf (1735–1792), German composer of at least 12 symphonies
Ignaz Fränzl (1736–1811), German composer of 2 symphonies
Michael Haydn (1737–1806), Austrian composer of 41 symphonies (brother of the more famous Joseph Haydn).
Josef Mysliveček (1737–1781), Czech composer of over 45 symphonies
Antonio Boroni (1738–1792), Italian composer of 1 symphony
William Herschel (1738–1822), German-born British composer of 24 symphonies
Leopold Hofmann (1738–1793), Austrian composer of several symphonies
Carl Ditters von Dittersdorf (1739–1799), Austrian composer of at least 120 symphonies
Johann Baptist Wanhal (1739–1813), Bohemian composer of 51 published symphonies
Ernst Eichner (1740–1777), German composer of 31 symphonies
Andrea Luchesi (1741–1801), Italian composer of at least 8 surviving symphonies
Johann Gottlieb Naumann (1741–1801), German composer of 12 symphonies
Wenzel Pichl (1741–1805), Austrian composer of about 89 symphonies
Henri-Joseph Rigel (1741–1799), German–French composer of at least 15 symphonies
Simon Le Duc (1742–1777), French composer of at least 4 surviving symphonies
Anton Ferdinand Titz (1742–1811), German composer of symphonies
Luigi Boccherini (1743–1805), Italian composer of about 30 symphonies
Josef Bárta (1744–1787), Czech composer of 13 symphonies
Maxim Berezovsky (c. 1745–1777), Ukrainian composer of at least 1 symphony
Gaetano Brunetti (1745–1798), Italian composer of at least 29 symphonies
Chevalier de Saint-Georges (1745–1799), French composer of 2 symphonies and 8 Symphonies concertantes
Georg Druschetzky (1745–1819), Czech composer of at least 27 symphonies
Carl Stamitz (1745–1801), composer of over 50 symphonies
Giuseppe Cambini (1746–1825), Italian violinist and composer of about 90 symphonies
Felice Alessandri (1747–1798), Italian composer of 6 symphonies
Leopold Koželuch (1747–1818), Czech composer of about 30 symphonies
Josef Fiala (1748–1816), Bohemian composer of several symphonies
Theodor von Schacht (1748–1823), German composer of at least 33 symphonies
Georg Joseph Vogler (1749–1814), German composer of 1 symphony

1750–1799 
Antonio Rosetti (c. 1750–1792), Bohemian composer, wrote about 50 symphonies
Johann Franz Xaver Sterkel (1750–1817), German composer of at least 24 symphonies
Muzio Clementi (1752–1832), Italian composer of as many as twenty symphonies of which only six survive, 2 with opus numbers and 4 without.
Justin Heinrich Knecht (1752–1817), German composer of 1 symphony
John Marsh (1752–1828), English composer of at least 39 symphonies
Ambrogio Minoja (1752–1825), Italian composer of 1 symphony
Jean-Baptiste Bréval (1753–1823), French composer of at least 9 concertante symphonies (of which two are lost) for several instruments
Franz Anton Hoffmeister (1754–1812), German composer of over 50 symphonies
Peter Winter (1754–1825), German composer of 3 symphonies
Antoine-Frédéric Gresnick (1755–1799), Belgian composer of 1 symphony and 1 concertante symphony for clarinet, bassoon and orchestra
Joseph Martin Kraus (1756–1792), German-Swedish composer of over 20 symphonies, not all of which survive
Wolfgang Amadeus Mozart (1756–1791), Austrian composer, one of the best-known Classical symphonists. Wrote around 50 symphonies, 41 of which are numbered (see the List of symphonies by Wolfgang Amadeus Mozart and the Category of Mozart symphonies)
Johann Vogel (1756–1788), German composer of 3 symphonies
Pavel Vranický (1756–1808), Bohemian composer of about 50 symphonies
Ignaz Pleyel (1757–1831), Austrian composer, publisher, and piano maker, wrote 41 symphonies
Alessandro Rolla (1757–1841), Italian composer of symphonies
António Leal Moreira (1758–1819), Portuguese composer of 3 orchestral symphonies and 1 for six organs
François Devienne (1759–1803), French flautist and composer of 1 symphony and 8 concertante symphonies
Franz Krommer (1759–1831), Czech composer of at least 10 symphonies
Luigi Cherubini (1760–1842), Italian composer (active in France) of the Symphony in D major (1815).
Friedrich Ludwig Aemilius Kunzen (1761–1817), German-born Danish composer of 1 symphony
Antonín Vranický (1761–1820), Czech composer of at least 15 symphonies, half-brother of Pavel Vranický
Franz Danzi (1763–1826), German composer of at least 6 symphonies, plus several sinfonie concertante
Adalbert Gyrowetz (1763–1850), Bohemian composer of around 60 symphonies, many of them commissioned by Johann Peter Salomon in London.
Étienne Méhul (1763–1817), French composer of at least 4 symphonies
Anton Eberl (1765–1807), Austrian composer of 5 symphonies
Joseph Leopold Eybler (1765–1846), Austrian composer of 2 symphonies
Samuel Wesley (1766–1837), English composer of 6 symphonies
Francesco Basili (1767–1850), Italian composer of at least 1 symphony (Sinfonia a piena orchestra sullo stile d'Haydn, 1841)
Andreas Romberg (1767–1821), German composer of 10 symphonies of which only 6 survive, 4 with opus numbers and 2 without.
Bernhard Romberg (1767–1841), German composer of 4 symphonies
Carlos Baguer (1768–1808), Spanish composer of 19 symphonies
Carl Andreas Göpfert (1768–1818), German composer of 3 symphonies
Józef Elsner (1769–1854), Polish composer of 8 symphonies
Ludwig van Beethoven (1770–1827), German composer (often considered the greatest of all symphonists) of 9 symphonies, of which the ninth (Choral, 1824) includes mixed chorus and parts for soprano, alto, tenor, and baritone in its finale; in addition, the composer also left sketches for a tenth symphony, later elaborated by Barry Cooper in 1988—see Category of Beethoven symphonies. Finally, the orchestral work Wellington's Victory, Op. 91 (1813) is sometimes referred to as the "Battle Symphony."
Anton Reicha (1770–1836), Czech–French composer of at least 12 symphonies
Friedrich Witt (1770–1836), German composer of 23 symphonies
Ferdinando Paer (1771–1839), Italian composer of 3 symphonies
Antonio Casimir Cartellieri (1772–1807), Polish–Austrian composer of 4 symphonies
Johann Wilhelm Wilms (1772–1847), German-born Dutch composer of 7 symphonies
Václav Jan Tomášek (1774–1850), Czech composer of 3 symphonies
Christoph Ernst Friedrich Weyse (1774–1842), German-born Danish composer of 7 symphonies
João Domingos Bomtempo (1775–1842), Portuguese composer of 2 symphonies
E. T. A. Hoffmann (1776–1822), German writer and composer of 1 symphony
Joseph Küffner (1776–1856), German composer of 7 symphonies
Sigismund von Neukomm (1778–1858), Austrian composer of 2 symphonies
Fernando Sor (1778–1839), Spanish composer of 3 symphonies
Joachim Nicolas Eggert (1779–1813), Swedish composer of 4 finished and 1 unfinished symphonies
José Eulalio Samayoa (1780–1866), Guatemalan composer of 3 extant symphonies
François-Joseph Fétis (1784–1871), Belgian musicologist and composer of 2 symphonies
George Onslow (1784–1853), French composer of 4 symphonies in a style combining echoes of Beethoven and Schubert
Ferdinand Ries (1784–1838), German composer of 8 symphonies, 1 of which is unpublished
Louis Spohr (1784–1859), German composer of 10 symphonies
Karol Kurpiński (1785–1857), Polish composer of 1 symphony
Henry Bishop (1786–1855), English composer of 1 symphony
Friedrich Schneider (1786–1853), German composer of 23 symphonies
Carl Maria von Weber (1786–1826), German composer of 2 symphonies, both in C major.
Johann Peter Pixis (1788–1874), German pianist and composer of 1 symphony
Friedrich Ernst Fesca (1789–1826), German composer of 3 symphonies
Ludwig Wilhelm Maurer (1789–1878), German composer of 1 symphony plus a Sinfonia concertante for four violins and orchestra
Karol Lipiński (1790–1861), Polish violinist and composer of 3 symphonies
Carl Czerny (1791–1857), Austrian composer of 7 symphonies
Ferdinand Hérold (1791–1833), French composer of 2 symphonies
Franz Xaver Wolfgang Mozart (1791–1844), Austrian composer of 1 symphony
Jan Václav Voříšek (1791–1825), Czech composer of 1 symphony
Cipriani Potter (1792–1871), English composer of 9 symphonies
Anselm Hüttenbrenner (1794–1868), Austrian composer of 2 symphonies
Ignaz Moscheles (1794–1870), Czech composer of 1 symphony
Franz Berwald (1796–1868), Swedish composer of 4 numbered symphonies, preceded by a Symphony in A major (1820), of which only a fragment of the first movement is extant—see Category of Berwald symphonies.
Carl Loewe (1796–1869), German composer of 2 symphonies
Giovanni Pacini (1796–1867), Italian composer of 1 symphony (Dante Symphony, 1863, first performance in 1865 for the 6th centenary of the birth of the poet)
Gaetano Donizetti (1797–1848), Italian composer of at least 15 symphonies
Franz Schubert (1797–1828), Austrian composer of 7 complete symphonies (Nos. 1–6, 9); two completed movements from the (incomplete) eighth (Unfinished, 1822) are regularly performed. In addition to No. 8, sketches for 5 other incomplete symphonies survive, a number of which have been elaborated by other composers, in particular Brian Newbould—see Schubert's symphonies and Category of Schubert symphonies.
Carl Gottlieb Reissiger (1798–1859), German composer of one symphony

1800–1849 
Vincenzo Bellini (1801–1835), Italian composer of 8 symphonies
John Lodge Ellerton (1801–1873), English composer of 6 symphonies
Jan Křtitel Václav Kalivoda or Johann Baptist Wenzel Kalliwoda (1801–1866), Czech composer of 7 symphonies
Adolf Fredrik Lindblad (1801–1878), Swedish composer of 2 symphonies
Bernhard Molique (1802–1869), German composer of 1 symphony
Hector Berlioz (1803–1869), French composer of 4 unnumbered, programmatic symphonies: Symphonie fantastique (1830), perhaps the first true programmatic symphony; Harold en Italie (1834), for viola obbligato and orchestra; Roméo et Juliette (1839), a choral symphony with parts for contralto and tenor soloists; and, Grande symphonie funèbre et triomphale (1840), scored for concert band, solo trombone, and (optional) chorus and strings.
Franz Lachner (1803–1890), German composer of 8 symphonies
Mikhail Glinka (1804–1857), Russian composer of 2 unfinished symphonies, the first completed by Petr Klimov and the second On Two Russian Themes by Vissarion Shebalin
Sir Julius Benedict (184–1885), German–British composer of 2 symphonies
Louise Farrenc (1804–1875), French composer of 3 symphonies
Johan Peter Emilius Hartmann (1805–1900), Danish composer of 2 symphonies
Juan Crisóstomo Arriaga (1806–1826), Spanish composer of 1 symphony
Johannes Frederik Fröhlich (1806–1860), Danish composer of 1 symphony
Ignacy Feliks Dobrzyński (1807–1867), Polish composer of 2 symphonies
Hilarión Eslava (1807–1878), Spanish composer of 1 symphony
Gottfried von Preyer (1807–1901), Austrian composer of 2 symphonies
Napoléon Henri Reber (1807–1880), French composer of 4 symphonies
Michael William Balfe (1808–1870), Irish composer of 1 symphony
Felix Mendelssohn (1809–1847), German composer of 5 numbered symphonies, the second (Lobgesang, 1840) of which is a "symphony-cantata" that includes parts for chorus, two sopranos, and tenor in the final ten of its thirteen movements—see Category of Mendelssohn symphonies. In addition, he completed 13 symphonies for strings.
Fredrik Pacius (1809–1891), German–Finnish composer a Symphony in D minor (1850)
Norbert Burgmüller (1810–1836), German composer of 2 symphonies
Otto Nicolai (1810–1849), German composer of 2 symphonies
Robert Schumann (1810–1856), German composer of 4 symphonies, as well as an earlier incomplete Symphony in G minor (Zwickau, WoO 29, 1832–33)—see Category of Schumann symphonies.
Félicien David (1810–1876), French composer of 3 symphonies, as well as the choral symphony Le désert (1844), which includes parts for speaker, tenor soloist, and male chorus.
Ferdinand Hiller (1811–1885), German composer of 4 symphonies
Franz Liszt (1811–1886), Hungarian composer of 2 unnumbered, programmatic symphonies, of which the Faust Symphony (1854, r. 1857–61 and 1880) includes male chorus and parts for organ and tenor soloist, while the Dante Symphony (1855–56) includes women's chorus and a soprano soloist.
Wilhelm Taubert (1811–1891), German composer of 4 symphonies
Karl Graedener (1812–1883), German composer of 2 symphonies
Emilie Mayer (1812–1883), German composer of 8 symphonies
Julius Rietz (1812–1877), German composer of 3 symphonies
Johann Rufinatscha (1812–1893), Austrian composer of 6 symphonies
William Henry Fry (1813–1864), American composer of 7 symphonies
George Alexander Macfarren (1813–1887), English composer of 9 symphonies
Richard Wagner (1813–1883), German composer of the Symphony in C major (1832, r. 1882), as well as sketches for a (incomplete) Symphony in E major (1834, WWV 35)
Mihály Mosonyi (1815–1870), Hungarian composer of 2 symphonies
Robert Volkmann (1815–1883), German composer of 2 symphonies
August Wilhelm Ambros (1816–1876), Austrian composer of 2 symphonies
Franz Krenn (1816–1897), Austrian composer of 1 symphony
Sir William Sterndale Bennett (1816–1875), English composer of 5 symphonies
Johannes Verhulst (1816–1891), Dutch composer of 1 symphony
Édouard Deldevez (1817–1897), French composer of at least 3 symphonies
Eduard Franck (1817–1893), German composer of 4 symphonies, of which Nos. 1 and 2 are lost
Niels Gade (1817–1890), Danish composer of 8 symphonies
Fritz Spindler (1817–1905), German composer of 2 symphonies
Charles Gounod (1818–1893), French composer of 2 numbered symphonies (a third was unfinished on his death) as well as a Petite symphonie for nine wind instruments.
Carl Helsted (1818–1904), Danish composer of 1 symphony
Théodore Gouvy (1819–1898), French composer of 9 symphonies
Oscar Byström (1821–1909), Swedish composer of 1 symphony
August Conradi (1821–1873), German composer of 5 symphonies
César Franck (1822–1890), Belgian composer of the Symphony in D minor (1888), known for its use of cyclic form.
Joachim Raff (1822–1882), Swiss-born German composer of 11 numbered symphonies, of which the eleventh (Der Winter, 1876) is unfinished (completion by Max Erdmannsdörfer). Also symphonic is the Grand Symphony in E minor (WoO 18, 1854), of which only two of the five movements are extant—see Category of Raff symphonies— and the Sinfonietta (Op. 188) for wind band of 1873, believed to be the earliest work to be designated a Sinfonietta. 
Carl Martin Reinthaler (1822–1896), German composer of 1 symphony
Édouard Lalo (1823–1892), French composer of the Symphony in G minor (1886), as well as the concertante work Symphonie espagnole, for violin and orchestra, Op. 21 (1874).
 Anton Bruckner (1824–1896), Austrian composer of 9 numbered symphonies, many of which—due to edits, cuts, and revisions—exist in multiple editions. The ninth (1887–96) is only partially complete, Bruckner having left the finale unfinished (a number of composers subsequently have made completions). In addition, two completed, unnumbered symphonies survive: the Study Symphony in F minor (WAB 99, 1863; often called Symphony No. 00) and the Symphony in D minor (WAB 100, 1869; often called Symphony No. 0 or Die Nullte). Finally, sketches for a (unfinished) Symphony in B-flat major (WAB 142, 1869) also survive—see List of symphonies by Anton Bruckner and Category of Bruckner symphonies.
Carl Reinecke (1824–1910), German composer of 3 numbered symphonies plus a symphony in G major (probably lost) and a Kinder–Sinfonie (op. 239)
Adolphe Samuel (1824–1898), Belgian composer of 7 symphonies
Bedřich Smetana (1824–1884), Czech composer of the Triumphal Symphony (1854, r. c. 1882; sometimes called the Festive Symphony)
Richard Wüerst (1824–1881), German composer of 3 symphonies
George Frederick Bristow (1825–1898), American composer of 6 symphonies
Richard Hol (1825–1904), Dutch composer of 4 symphonies
Walter Cecil Macfarren (1826–1905), English composer of 1 symphony
Ernst Pauer (1826–1905), Austrian composer of 1 symphony
Hugo Staehle (1826–1848), German composer of 1 symphony
Julius Otto Grimm (1827–1903), German composer of 1 symphony
Ludwig Meinardus (1827–1896), German composer of 2 symphonies
Woldemar Bargiel (1828–1897), German composer of 1 symphony
Pietro Platania (1828–1907), Italian composer of 3 symphonies
Albert Dietrich (1829–1908), German composer of 1 symphony
Louis Moreau Gottschalk (1829–1869), American composer of 2 symphonies: Symphonie romantique "A Night in the Tropics" and "À Montevideo"
Anton Rubinstein (1829–1894), Russian composer of 6 symphonies
Hans Bronsart von Schellendorff (1830–1913), German composer of 2 symphonies (both lost)
Karl Goldmark (1830–1915), Hungarian composer of 2 symphonies
Eduard Lassen (1830–1904), Danish–Belgian composer of 2 symphonies
Robert Radecke (1830–1911), German composer of 1 symphony
Johann von Herbeck (1831–1877), Austrian composer of 4 symphonies
Salomon Jadassohn (1831–1902), German composer of 4 symphonies
Ludvig Norman (1831–1885),  Swedish composer, conductor, pianist who wrote 3 symphonies
Johann Joseph Abert (1832–1915), German composer of 7 symphonies
Leopold Damrosch (1832–1885), German–American conductor and composer of 1 symphony
Alexander Borodin (1833–1887), Russian composer of 2 symphonies, as well as sketches for two movements to a (incomplete) third symphony—subsequently orchestrated by Alexander Glazunov.
Johannes Brahms (1833–1897), German composer—considered by Eduard Hanslick to be the artistic heir of Beethoven—of 4 symphonies, of which the first (1854–76) is sometimes referred to as "Beethoven's Tenth" (for example, by conductor Hans von Bülow)—see Category of Brahms symphonies.
Albert Becker (1834–1899), German composer of 1 symphony
Vilém Blodek (1834–1874), Czech composer of 1 symphony
Amilcare Ponchielli (1834–1886), Italian composer of 2 symphonies 
Felix Draeseke (1835–1913), German composer of 4 symphonies
Ebenezer Prout (1835–1909), English composer of 4 symphonies
Camille Saint-Saëns (1835–1921), French composer of 3 numbered symphonies, of which the third (1886) includes a part for organ; he also completed two unnumbered symphonies, in A major (1850) and F major (Urbs Roma; 1856), respectively.
Bernhard Scholz (1835–1916), German composer of 2 symphonies
August Winding (1835–1899), Danish composer of 1 symphony
Emil Hartmann (1836–1898), Danish composer of 7 symphonies
Mily Balakirev (1837–1910), Russian composer of 2 symphonies
John Francis Barnett (1837–1916), English composer of 1 symphony
Théodore Dubois (1837–1924), French composer of 3 symphonies
Alexandre Guilmant (1837–1911), French composer of 2 symphonies for organ and orchestra, which are versions of his 1st and the 8th organ sonatas, respectively
Karl Adolf Lorenz (1837–1923), German composer of 1 symphony
Heinrich Urban (1837–1901), German composer of 1 symphony
Józef Wieniawski (1837–1912), Polish pianist and composer of 1 symphony 
Georges Bizet (1838–1875), French composer of 2 symphonies. The composer referred to the second as Roma (1861–71), although it is classified often as a suite.
Max Bruch (1838–1920), German composer of 3 symphonies
Alexis de Castillon (1838–1873), French composer of 2 symphonies
Heinrich Schulz-Beuthen (1838–1915), German composer of 8 symphonies (2 others are incomplete) 
Ferdinand Thieriot (1838–1919), German composer of 9 symphonies plus a sinfonietta
Friedrich Gernsheim (1839–1916), German composer of 4 symphonies
Victorin de Joncières (1839–1903), French composer of 1 symphony (Symphonie romantique)
Eduard Nápravník (1839–1916), Czech–Russian composer of 4 symphonies
John Knowles Paine (1839–1906), American composer of 2 symphonies
Josef Rheinberger (1839–1901), Liechtensteiner composer of 2 symphonies
Alice Mary Smith (1839–1884), English composer of 3 symphonies
Louis-Albert Bourgault-Ducoudray (1840–1910), French composer of 2 symphonies (the second, Symphonie religieuse for choir and orchestra)
Samuel de Lange jr. (1840–1911), Dutch composer of 5 symphonies
Hermann Goetz (1840–1876), German composer of 1 symphony (1 other is incomplete) 
Ernst Rudorff (1840–1916), German composer of 3 symphonies
Johan Svendsen (1840–1911), Norwegian composer of 2 symphonies (A third symphony allegedly was destroyed during an 1883 domestic dispute.)
Pyotr Ilyich Tchaikovsky (1840–1893), Russian composer of 6 numbered symphonies; the programmatic Manfred Symphony, Op. 58 (1885) is unnumbered; a seventh symphony, in E, was abandoned in 1892 (Bogatyrev completion c. 1955), with the first movement re-scored in 1894 by the composer as Allegro Brillante for piano and orchestra—see Category of Tchaikovsky symphonies.
Elfrida Andrée (1841–1929), Swedish composer of 2 orchestral and 2 organ symphonies
Giovanni Bolzoni (1841–1919), Italian composer of 1 symphony
Antonín Dvořák (1841–1904), Czech composer of 9 symphonies; many of his symphonies utilize Bohemian folk elements, while the ninth (From the New World, 1893) was inspired by Native American music and African-American spirituals—see Category of Dvořák symphonies.
Giovanni Sgambati (1841–1914), Italian composer of 2 numbered symphonies plus "Sinfonia-Epitalamio" and "Sinfonia Festosa"
Arrigo Boito (1842–1918), Italian composer of 1 symphony
Heinrich Hofmann (1842–1902), German composer of 1 symphony
Ödön Mihalovich (1842–1929), Hungarian composer of 4 symphonies
Arthur Sullivan (1842–1900), British composer of 1 symphony
Edvard Grieg (1843–1907), Norwegian composer of the Symphony in C minor (1864), as well as sketches for a second.
Asger Hamerik (1843–1923), Danish conductor and composer of 8 symphonies
Heinrich von Herzogenberg (1843–1900), Austrian composer of 8 symphonies 
Charles Lefebvre (1843–1917), French composer of 1 symphony
Miguel Marqués (1843–1918), Spanish composer of 5 symphonies
Hermann Graedener (1844–1929), German composer of 2 symphonies
Émile Paladilhe (1844–1926), French composer of 1 symphony
Nikolai Rimsky-Korsakov (1844–1908), Russian composer of 3 symphonies, the second of which (Antar, Op. 9; 1868, r. 1897 and 1903) the composer later reclassified as a symphonic suite; in addition, he left sketches for two other symphonies.
Charles-Marie Widor (1844–1937), French composer of 6 orchestral symphonies and 10 symphonies for organ
August Bungert (1845–1915), German composer of 1 symphony (Sinfonia Vietrix op. 70 for choir, solo voices and orchestra)
Anastazy Wilhelm Dreszer (1845–1907), Polish composer of 2 symphonies
Gabriel Fauré (1845–1924), French composer of 1 symphony (Op. 40, unpublished, the manuscript was destroyed; material was re-used in the late violin sonata n. 2 Op.108 and cello sonata n. 1 Op.109)
Ignaz Brüll (1846–1907), Austrian composer of 1 symphony
William Gilchrist (1846–1916), American composer of at least one symphony
Zygmunt Noskowski (1846–1909), Polish composer of 3 symphonies
Robert Fuchs (1847–1927), Austrian composer of 3 symphonies
Johannes Haarklou (1847–1925), Norwegian composer of 4 symphonies
August Klughardt (1847–1902), German composer of 6 symphonies. The first one, titled Waldleben (Life in the forest) was withdrawn
Otto Malling (1848–1915), Danish composer of 1 symphony
Hubert Parry (1848–1918), British composer of 5 symphonies
Henri Dallier (1849–1934), French organist and composer of 1 symphony
Benjamin Godard (1849–1895), French composer of 5 symphonies
Arnold Krug (1849–1904), German composer of 2 symphonies

1850–1899 
Tomás Bretón (1850–1923), Spanish composer of 3 symphonies (No. 1, F major, 1872; No. 2, E-flat major, 1883; and No. 3, G major, 1905)
Zdeněk Fibich (1850–1900), Czech composer of 3 symphonies (No. 1, F major, 1883; No. 2, E-flat major, 1893; and No. 3, E minor, 1899); sketches for three other symphonic projects are also extant: two symphonies from his student years (c. 1860s), in E-flat major (two movements survive scored for string quartet) and G minor (a Scherzo survives for piano duet); and, one symphonic fragment from the year of his death
Jacob Adolf Hägg (1850-1928), Swedish composer of 4 symphonies
Iver Holter (1850–1941), Norwegian composer of a Symphony in F major (c. 1878–84)
Peter Lange-Müller (1850–1926), Danish composer of 2 symphonies (No. 1, D minor, Autumn, 1879; and No. 2, D minor, 1889, r. 1915)
Luise Adolpha Le Beau (1850–1927), German composer of 1 symphony
Ole Olsen (1850–1927), Norwegian composer of a Symphony in G major (1876)
Xaver Scharwenka (1850–1924), German–Polish composer of a Symphony in C minor (1882)
Antonio Scontrino (1850–1922), Italian composer of 2 symphonies
Alexander Taneyev (1850–1918), Russian composer of 3 symphonies
Anton Urspruch (1850–1907), German composer of a Symphony in E-flat major (1881)
Victor Bendix (1851–1926), Danish composer of 4 symphonies (No. 1, C major, Mountain Climbing, 1882; No. 2, D major, Sounds of Summer from South Russia, 1888; No. 3, A minor, 1895; and No. 4, D minor, 1906)
Jan Blockx (1851–1912), Belgian composer of a Symphony in D major (1885)
Ruperto Chapí (1851–1909), Spanish composer of a Symphony in D minor (1879)
Vincent d'Indy (1851–1931), French composer of 3 numbered symphonies; also symphonic is the Symphony on a French Mountain Air, for piano and orchestra, Op. 25 (1886) and the programmatic symphony Jean Hundaye, Op. 5 (1874–75).
Mykhailo Kalachevsky (1851-c.1910), Ukrainian composer of a Symphony called ''Ukrainian'' (1876)
Antoni Stolpe (1851–1872), Polish composer of a Symphony in A minor (1867)
Sir Frederic Hymen Cowen (1852–1935), British composer of 6 symphonies and a sinfonietta
Hans Huber (1852–1921), Swiss composer of 8 numbered symphonies, plus an A major symphony (1889, unpublished)
Charles Villiers Stanford (1852–1924), British composer of 7 symphonies
Hans von Koessler (1853–1926), German composer of 2 symphonies
André Messager (1853–1929), French composer of a Symphony in A major (1876)
Jean Louis Nicodé (1853–1919), German composer of 1 symphony
George Whitefield Chadwick (1854–1931), American composer of 3 symphonies
Moritz Moszkowski (1854–1925), German pianist and composer of 1 symphony
Bernard Zweers (1854–1924), Dutch composer of 3 symphonies (No. 1, D major, 1881; No. 2, E-flat major, 1883; and No. 3, B-flat major, To My Fatherland, 1890)
Ernest Chausson (1855–1899), French composer of the Symphony in B-flat major (1890), as well as sketches for a second (1899)
Michele Esposito (1855–1929), Italian composer of 2 symphonies
Prince Heinrich XXIV Reuss of Köstritz (1855–1910), German composer of 6 symphonies
Julius Röntgen (1855–1932), Dutch composer of 21 symphonies
Arthur Bird (1856–1923), American composer of 1 symphony
André Gedalge (1856–1926), French composer of 4 symphonies (the last unfinished)
Robert Kajanus (1856–1933), Finnish composer of a Sinfonietta for Strings in B-flat major (1915); the Kalevala-based symphonic poem Aino, for male chorus and orchestra, is often misclassified as a symphony. 
Giuseppe Martucci (1856–1909), Italian composer of 2 symphonies
Christian Sinding (1856–1941), Norwegian composer of 4 symphonies
Sergei Taneyev (1856–1915), Russian composer of 4 symphonies
George Templeton Strong (1856–1948), American composer of 3 symphonies
Cécile Chaminade (1857–1944), French composer of 1 symphony (Les Amazones, for choir and orchestra)
Frederic Cliffe (1857–1931), English composer of 2 symphonies
Sir Edward Elgar (1857–1934), English composer of 2 symphonies, with sketches for a third elaborated into a performing version by Anthony Payne in 1997—see Category of Elgar symphonies. In addition, the composer referred to a fourth work, The Black Knight (1889–93), as a "symphony for chorus and orchestra," although it is classified typically as a cantata.
Edgar Stillman Kelley (1857–1944), American composer of 2 symphonies
Sylvio Lazzari (1857–1944), French composer of a Symphony in E-flat major (1907)
Catharinus Elling (1858–1942), Norwegian composer of 2 symphonies (No. 1, A major, 1890; and No. 2, A minor, 1897) 
Richard Franck (1858–1938), German composer of 1 symphony
Jenő Hubay (1858–1937), Hungarian violinist and composer of 4 symphonies (the last two with voices and chorus)
Hans Rott (1858–1884), Austrian composer of a Symphony in E major (1880), as well as a Symphony for Strings in A-flat major (1875); the composer also left sketches for a second symphony
Harry Rowe Shelley (1858–1947), American composer of 2 symphonies
Max Fiedler (1859–1939), German conductor and composer of 1 symphony
Gerard von Brucken Fock (1859–1935), Dutch composer of 3 symphonies
Josef Bohuslav Foerster (1859–1951), Czech composer of 5 symphonies
Eugène d'Harcourt (1859–1918), French composer of 3 symphonies
Alexander Ilyinsky (1859–1920), Russian composer of 1 symphony
Mikhail Ippolitov-Ivanov (1859–1935), Russian composer of 2 symphonies plus a "Sinfonietta for Orchestra"
Sergei Lyapunov (1859–1924), Russian composer of 2 symphonies (No. 1, B minor, 1887; and No. 2, B-flat minor, 1917)
Pietro Floridia (1860–1932), Italian–American composer of 1 symphony
Alberto Franchetti (1860–1942), Italian composer of a Symphony in E minor (1885)
Gustav Mahler (1860–1911), Austrian composer of 9 numbered symphonies, the third (1893–96) of which is his longest symphony at approximately 105 minutes, while the eighth (1906) calls for three choirs and eight vocal soloists (and premiered with over 1,000 performers); in addition, the composer also left detailed sketches for a tenth symphony, later elaborated by, among others, Deryck Cooke—see Category of Mahler symphonies. Finally, a composition for soprano, tenor, and orchestra, Das Lied von der Erde (1908–09), is classified as an unnumbered symphony.
Ignacy Jan Paderewski (1860–1941), Polish composer of a Symphony in B minor, Op. 24 (Polonia, 1908)
Emil von Reznicek (1860–1945), Austrian composer of 5 symphonies
William Wallace (1860–1940), Scottish composer of a "Creation Symphony"
Felix Woyrsch (1860–1944), German composer of 7 symphonies
Anton Arensky (1861–1906), Russian composer of 2 symphonies (No. 1, B minor, 1883; and No. 2, A major, 1889)
Wilhelm Berger (1861–1911), German composer of 2 symphonies
Georgy Catoire (1861–1926), Russian composer of a Symphony in C minor (c. 1889 91, orch. 1895–98)
Ludwig Thuille (1861–1907), Austrian composer of a Symphony in F major (1885, r. 1886)
Léon Boëllmann (1862–1897), French composer of a Symphony in F major (1894)
Claude Debussy (1862–1918), French composer of a two-movement Symphony in B minor (1880), scored for piano four-hands, as well as La mer (1905), a set of three "symphonic sketches" that the composer occasionally referred to as a symphony 
Maurice Emmanuel (1862–1938), French composer of 2 symphonies (No. 1, A major, 1919; and No. 2, Bretonne, A major, 1931) 
Edward German (1862–1936), English composer of 2 symphonies (No. 1, E minor, 1887, r. 1890; and No. 2, A minor, Norwich, 1893), as well as sketches for an abandoned Symphony in B-flat major, some material from which was incorporated into the Second
Friedrich Koch (1862–1927), German composer of 2 symphonies
Alberto Williams (1862–1952), Argentine composer of 9 symphonies
Felix Blumenfeld (1863–1931), Russian composer of a Symphony in C minor, À la mémoire des chers défunts (1906)
Hugo Kaun (1863–1932), German composer of 3 symphonies
Emánuel Moór (1863–1931), Hungarian composer of 8 symphonies
Horatio Parker (1863–1919), American composer of 1 symphony
Arthur Somervell (1863–1937), English composer of a Symphony in D minor, Thalassa (1913) 
Jāzeps Vītols (1863–1948), Latvian composer of 2 symphonies
Felix Weingartner (1863–1942), Austrian composer of 7 symphonies and a sinfonietta
Eugen d'Albert (1864–1932), German composer of a Symphony in F major (1886)
Hjalmar Borgstrøm (1864–1925), Norwegian composer of 2 symphonies
Louis Glass (1864–1936), Danish composer of 6 symphonies (No. 1, E major, 1894; No. 2, C minor, 1899; No. 3, Wood Symphony, D major, 1901; No. 4, E minor, 1911; No. 5, Svastika, C major, 1920; and No. 6, Birth of the Scyldings, 1924), of which the Second includes parts for male chorus and organ
Alexander Gretchaninov (1864–1956), Russian composer of 5 symphonies (No. 1, B minor, 1894; No. 2, Pastoral, A major, 1908; No. 3, E major, 1923; No. 4, C major, 1927; and No. 5, G minor, 1936); sketches exist for an unfinished Sixth (c. 1940s)
Johan Halvorsen (1864–1935), Norwegian composer of 3 symphonies (No. 1, C minor, 1923; No. 2, Fatum, D minor, 1924, r. 1928; and No. 3, C major, 1929)
Alexandre Levy (1864–1892), Brazilian composer of a Symphony in E minor (1888)
Alberto Nepomuceno (1864–1920), Brazilian composer of a Symphony in G minor (1893)
Guy Ropartz (1864–1955), French composer of 5 symphonies (No. 1, On a Breton Chorale, A minor, 1895; No. 2, F minor, 1900; No. 3, E major, 1906; No. 4, C major, 1911; and No. 5, G major, 1945), of which the Third include parts for soprano, contralto, tenor, bass, and mixed chorus; also symphonic is the Petite symphonie, for orchestra (1943) 
Richard Strauss (1864–1949), German composer of 2 early conventional symphonies; also of 2 program symphonies of his maturity, symphonic in name and scale if not traditional technique; namely the multi-section symphonic poems Symphonia Domestica, Op. 53 (1903) and An Alpine Symphony, Op. 64 (1915). His Sonatina No. 2 for 16 Wind Instruments (1946) was given the title Symphony for Wind Instruments by the publisher, though the composer did not use the word.
August de Boeck (1865–1937), Belgian composer of a Symphony in G major (1896)
Paul Dukas (1865–1935), French composer of a Symphony in C major (1896)
Paul Gilson (1865–1942), Belgian composer of 3 symphonies and La Mer (4 Symphonic sketches)
Alexander Glazunov (1865–1936), Russian composer of 8 symphonies, as well as sketches for a ninth (piano sketch, 1910; later orchestrated by Gavril Yudin)—see Category of Glazunov symphonies.
Albéric Magnard (1865–1914), French composer of 4 symphonies (No. 1, C minor, 1890; No. 2, E major, 1893; No. 3, B-flat minor, 1896; and No. 4, C-sharp minor, 1913)
Carl Nielsen (1865–1931), Danish composer of 6 symphonies (No. 1 in G minor, 1894; No. 2, The Four Temperaments, 1902; No. 3, Sinfonia espansiva, 1911; No 4, Inextinguishable, 1916; No. 5, 1922; and No. 6, Sinfonia semplice, 1925), of which the Third utilizes a vocalise for soprano and baritone in its second movement—see Category of Nielsen symphonies
Jean Sibelius (1865–1957), Finnish composer of 7 symphonies (No. 1, E minor, 1899, r. 1900; No. 2, D major, 1902; No. 3, C major, 1907; No. 4, A minor, 1911; No. 5, E-flat major, 1915, r. 1916, r. 1919; No. 6, D minor, 1923; and No. 7, C major, 1924), of which the Seventh (in one movement) erodes the traditional subdivisions of sonata form; the composer also destroyed sketches for an unfinished eighth in the 1930s. In addition, the choral work Kullervo (1892) and Lemminkäinen (1895)—both based upon Kalevala myths—are classified occasionally as unnumbered, programmatic symphonies—see Category of Sibelius symphonies
Waldemar von Baußnern (1866–1931), German composer of 8 symphonies and 1 chamber symphony
Vasily Kalinnikov (1866–1901), Russian composer of 2 symphonies (No. 1, G minor, 1895; and No. 2, A major, 1897)
Georg Schumann (1866–1952), German composer of 2 symphonies
Amy Beach (1867–1944), American composer of the Gaelic Symphony (1894), the first such work to be composed by a female American composer
Christian Danning (1867–1925), Danish composer of 3 symphonies
Charles Koechlin (1867–1950), French composer of 5 symphonies
Wilhelm Peterson-Berger (1867–1942), Swedish composer of 5 symphonies
Ewald Straesser (1867–1933), German composer of 6 symphonies (at least 3 unpublished)
Gustav Strube (1867–1953), German–American composer of 2 symphonies
Granville Bantock (1868–1946), British composer of 4 unnumbered symphonies, chronologically as: the Hebridean Symphony (1913); the Pagan Symphony (1927); The Cyprian Goddess (1939); and the Celtic Symphony (1940), for string orchestra and harps
Hermann Bischoff (1868–1936), German composer of 2 symphonies
Frederic Lamond (1868–1948), Scottish pianist and composer of 1 symphony
Sir John Blackwood McEwen (1868–1948), Scottish composer of 5 symphonies
José Vianna da Motta (1868–1948), Portuguese pianist and composer of 1 symphony
Henry Walford Davies (1869–1941), English composer of 2 symphonies
Robert Hermann (1869-1912), Swiss composer of 2 Symphonies, one in 1895 and the other in 1905.
Alfred Hill (1869–1960), Australian composer of 12 symphonies
Vasily Kalafati (1869–1942), Russian composer of 1 symphony
Henryk Melcer-Szczawiński (1869–1928), Polish composer of 1 symphony
Hans Pfitzner (1869–1949), German composer of 2 symphonies plus a Kleine Sinfonie (Op. 44, 1939)
Albert Roussel (1869–1937), French composer of 4 symphonies
Howard Brockway (1870–1951), American composer of 1 symphony
Ludvík Čelanský (1870–1931), Czech composer of 1 symphony
Cornelis Dopper (1870–1939), Dutch composer of 7 symphonies
Emil Młynarski (1870–1935), Polish composer of a Symphony in F major (Polonia, Op. 14, 1910)
 Vítězslav Novák (1870–1949), Czech composer of two unnumbered symphonies (the Autumn Symphony, 1934, for mixed chorus and orchestra; and the May Symphony, 1943, for soloists, mixed chorus, and orchestra)
Joseph Ryelandt (1870–1965), Belgian composer of 6 symphonies
Florent Schmitt (1870–1958), French composer of 3 symphonies, chronologically as: a Symphonie concertante, for piano and orchestra (1932); a symphony for strings, Janiana (1941); and a "Symphony No. 2" (1957)
Hermann Suter (1870–1926), Swiss composer of a Symphony in D minor (1914)
Charles Tournemire (1870–1939), French composer of 8 orchestral symphonies, as well as a Simphonie-choral and Symphonie sacrée for organ
Louis Vierne (1870–1937), French composer of a Symphony in A minor (1908), as well as six numbered symphonies for solo organ
Adolphe Biarent (1871–1916), Belgian composer of 1 symphony
Frederick Converse (1871–1940), American composer of 5 symphonies
Henry Kimball Hadley (1871–1937), American composer of 5 symphonies
Sigurd Lie (1871–1904), Norwegian composer of a Symphony in A minor (1903)
Ruben Liljefors (1871–1936), Swedish composer of a Symphony in E-flat major (1906)
Wilhelm Stenhammar (1871–1927), Swedish composer of 2 symphonies (No. 1, F major, 1903; and No. 2, G minor, 1915), the first of which he disowned after it premiered; the composer also left a fragment for a third symphony (1918–1919)
Alexander von Zemlinsky (1871–1942), Austrian composer of 2 numbered symphonies (No. 1, D minor, 1893; and No. 2, B-flat major, 1897), as well as a (incomplete) Symphony in E minor (1891) from his student years; also symphonic are the Lyric Symphony (1923), for soprano, baritone, and orchestra; a Sinfonietta (1934); and the symphonic fantasy Die Seejungfrau (The Mermaid, 1903)—the last a symphony in all but name
Hugo Alfvén (1872–1960), Swedish composer of 5 symphonies (No. 1, F minor, 1897; No. 2, D major, 1898; No. 3, E major, 1905; No. 4, From the Outermost Skerries, C minor, 1919; and No. 5, A minor, 1942–53, r. 1958), of which the Fourth includes a vocalise for soprano and tenor
Eyvind Alnæs (1872–1932), Norwegian composer of 2 symphonies (No. 1, C minor, 1897; and No. 2, D major, 1923)
Frederic Austin (1872–1952), English baritone and composer of 1 symphony
Felix Borowski (1872–1956), British–American composer of 3 symphonies
Arthur Farwell (1872–1972), American composer of 1 symphony (1934), developed from a fragmentary opening left by his mentor Rudolph Gott
Paul Graener (1872–1944), German composer of 3 symphonies and a sinfonietta (for harp and strings)
Siegmund von Hausegger (1872–1948), Austrian composer of the Natursymphonie (Nature Symphony, 1911), the finale of which includes mixed chorus
Edward Burlingame Hill (1872–1960), American composer of 4 symphonies
Paul Juon (1872–1940), Russian–Swiss composer of 4 unnumbered symphonies: a Symphony in F-sharp minor (1895), a Symphony in A major (1903), a Kleine Sinfonie in A minor (Little Symphony, 1929), and a Rhapsodische Sinfonie (Rhapsodic Symphony, 1939); also symphonic is a chamber symphony (1907) and a Sinfonietta capricciosa for orchestra (1939)
Alexander Scriabin (1872–1915), Russian composer of 3 numbered symphonies (No. 1, E major, 1900; No. 2, C minor, 1901; and No. 3, The Divine Poem, C minor, 1903), of which the First includes parts for mezzo-soprano and tenor; his two tone poems, The Poem of Ecstasy (1908) and Prometheus: The Poem of Fire (1910) are classified frequently as Symphonies Nos. 4 and 5, respectively—see Category of Scriabin symphonies
Bernhard Sekles (1872–1934), German composer of 1 symphony
Sergei Vasilenko (1872–1956), Russian composer of 2 symphonies
Ralph Vaughan Williams (1872–1958), English composer of 9 symphonies, the first of which (A Sea Symphony; 1903–09) includes a chorus as well as parts for soprano and baritone, while the third (A Pastoral Symphony; 1922) utilizes a vocalise for soprano in the fourth movement—see Category of Vaughan Williams symphonies.
Dimitri Arakishvili (1873–1953), Georgian composer of 3 symphonies
Blagoje Bersa (1873–1934), Croatian composer of 1 symphony
Joseph Jongen (1873–1953), Belgian composer of a Symphony for orchestra, Op. 15 (1898), as well as Symphonie concertante for organ and orchestra, Op. 81 (1926)
Witold Maliszewski (1873–1939), Polish composer of 5 symphonies
Daniel Gregory Mason (1873–1953), American composer of 3 symphonies
Henri Rabaud (1873–1949), French composer of 2 symphonies
Sergei Rachmaninoff (1873–1943), Russian composer of 3 numbered symphonies, as well as the choral symphony The Bells, Op. 35 (1913); also symphonic is the unfinished Youth Symphony in D minor (1891)—see Category of Rachmaninoff symphonies. 
Julius Bittner (1874–1939), Austrian composer of 2 symphonies
Gustav Holst (1874–1934), English composer of a Symphony F major (The Cotswolds, 1900), as well as a First Choral Symphony (1924), for soprano, mixed chorus, and orchestra (fragmentary sketches also exist for a Second Choral Symphony); in addition, the composer also completed a Scherzo (1933–34) for a projected but unfinished symphony.
Charles Ives (1874–1954), American composer of 4 numbered symphonies, the fourth (1910–24) of which requires two conductors and includes parts for piano (four-hands); in addition, he wrote two unnumbered symphonies: New England Holidays (1897–1913) and the (unfinished) Universe Symphony (1911–28)—see Category of Ives symphonies.
Paul Pierné (1874–1952), French composer of 2 symphonies
Heinrich Kaspar Schmid (1874–1953), German composer of 1 symphony
Franz Schmidt (1874–1939), Austrian composer of 4 symphonies
Arnold Schoenberg (1874–1951), Austrian composer of 2 chamber symphonies and sketches for several (unfinished) symphonies. In addition, the tone poem Pelleas und Melisande, Op. 5 (1902–03) is sometimes considered to have symphonic qualities—for example, by Alban Berg.
Josef Suk (1874–1935), Czech composer of 2 unnumbered symphonies: the Symphony in E major, Op. 14 (1897–99) and the Asrael Symphony, Op. 27 (1905–06)—a 'funeral symphony' in commemoration of the deaths of his wife, Otilie Suková, and of his father-in-law, Antonín Dvořák.
Franco Alfano (1875–1954), Italian composer of 2 symphonies (No. 1, Classica, E major, 1910, r. 1953; and No. 2, C major, 1932, r. 1933)
Julián Carrillo (1875–1965), Mexican composer, wrote 2 symphonies plus 3 atonal symphonies written in the "Thirteen Sound" technique
Samuel Coleridge-Taylor (1875–1912), English composer of a Symphony in A minor (1896)
Reinhold Glière (1875–1956), Russian composer of 3 symphonies (No. 1, E-flat major, 1900; No. 2, C minor, 1908; and No. 3, Ilya Muromets, B minor, 1911)
Erkki Melartin (1875–1937), Finnish composer of 6 symphonies (No. 1, C minor, 1902; No. 2, E minor, 1904; No. 3, F major, 1907; No. 4, Summer Symphony, F major, 1912; No. 5, Sinfonia brevis, A minor, 1915; and No. 6, 1924), of which the Fourth includes a vocalise for soprano, mezzo-soprano, and contralto in its third movement; also extant are three additional symphonic projects in fragmentary form: No. 7, Sinfonia gaia (1936); No. 8 (1937); and No. 9 (c. 1930s) 
Cyril Rootham (1875–1938), English composer of 2 symphonies, of which the Second (The Revelation of St. John, 1938) is for orchestra and chorus
Donald Tovey (1875–1940), British composer of a Symphony in D major (1913)
Richard Wetz (1875–1935), German composer of 3 symphonies (No. 1, C minor, 1917; No. 2, A major, 1919; and No. 3, B-flat minor, 1922)
Hakon Børresen (1876–1954), Danish composer of 3 symphonies (No. 1, C minor, 1901; No. 2, The Sea, A major, 1904; No. 3, and C major, 1926)
Havergal Brian (1876–1972), English composer of 32 symphonies, most of which he wrote in his seventies and eighties. His first symphony, The Gothic, is one of the largest symphonies ever written
John Alden Carpenter (1876–1951), American composer of 2 symphonies
Mieczysław Karłowicz (1876–1909), Polish composer of 1 symphony
Ludolf Nielsen (1876–1939), Danish composer of 3 symphonies (B minor, 1903; E major, Symphony of Joy, 1909; and C major, 1913)
Bruno Walter (1876–1962), German conductor and composer of 2 symphonies
Ermanno Wolf-Ferrari (1876–1948), Italian-German composer of the Sinfonia da camera (Chamber Symphony) in B-flat major (1901), as well as Sinfonia brevis in E-flat major (1947), for orchestra
Sergei Bortkiewicz (1877–1952), Austrian pianist and composer of 2 symphonies
Ernő Dohnányi (1877–1960), Hungarian composer of two numbered symphonies (D minor, 1901; and E major, 1945, r. 1957), as well as an earlier Symphony in F major (1896)
Thomas Dunhill (1877–1946), English composer of 1 symphony
Albert Dupuis (1877–1967), Belgian composer of 2 symphonies
Rudolph Ganz (1877–1972), Swiss–American composer of 1 symphony
Luis Gianneo (1877–1968), Argentine composer of 1 symphony
Alexander Goedicke (1877–1957), Russian composer of 3 symphonies
Jean Huré (1877–1930), French composer of 3 symphonies
Paul Ladmirault (1877–1944), French composer of 1 symphony
Ernst Mielck (1877–1899), Finnish composer of the Symphony in F minor (1897)
Roderich Mojsisovics von Mojsvar (1877–1953), Austrian composer of 3 symphonies
Feliks Nowowiejski (1877–1946), Polish composer of 4 symphonies
David Stanley Smith (1877–1945), American composer of 5 symphonies
Rutland Boughton (1878–1960), English composer of 3 symphonies
Fritz Brun (1878–1959), Swiss conductor and composer of 10 symphonies
Adam Carse (1878–1958), English composer of 2 symphonies for strings
Antun Dobronić (1878–1955), Croatian composer of 8 symphonies
Carl Ehrenberg (1878–1962), German composer of 2 symphonies
Joseph Holbrooke (1878–1958), English composer of 9 symphonies
Artur Kapp (1878–1952), Estonian composer. Generally considered to be one of the founders of Estonian symphonic music. He wrote 5 symphonies
Arrigo Pedrollo (1878–1964), Italian composer of 1 symphony
Franz Schreker (1878–1934), Austrian composer of 1 symphony (unpublished) and 1 chamber symphony
Volkmar Andreae (1879–1962), Swiss composer of 2 symphonies
Natanael Berg (1879–1957), Swedish composer of 5 symphonies
Frank Bridge (1879–1941), English composer of an unfinished Symphony for Strings (1941)
Grzegorz Fitelberg (1879–1953), Polish composer of 2 symphonies
Philippe Gaubert (1879–1941), French composer of a Symphony in F major (1936)
Sir Hamilton Harty (1879–1941), Irish composer of An Irish Symphony (1904, r. 1915, 1924)
Otto Olsson (1879-1964), Swedish composer of 1 symphony, Op.11 (1901–02)
Otakar Ostrčil (1879–1935), Czech composer of 1 symphony and 1 sinfonietta
Ottorino Respighi (1879–1936), Italian composer of the Sinfonia drammatica (1914)
Cyril Scott (1879–1970), English composer of 4 symphonies
Johanna Senfter (1879–1961), German composer of 9 symphonies
Julius Weismann (1879–1950), German composer of 3 symphonies
Adolf Wiklund (1879–1950), Swedish composer of 1 symphony
Edgar Bainton (1880–1956), British composer of 4 symphonies
Ernest Bloch (1880–1959), American composer of Swiss origin, whose works include (in addition to an unpublished Symphonie orientale amongst his juvenilia) a Symphony in C-sharp minor, a Sinfonia Breve, a Symphony for Trombone and Orchestra, and a Symphony in E-flat
Désiré-Émile Inghelbrecht (1880–1965), French composer of a Sinfonia brève da camera (1930)
Rudolf Karel (1880–1945), Czech composer of 4 symphonies (the second for violin and orchestra)
Ildebrando Pizzetti (1880–1968), Italian composer of "Symphony in A" and "Sinfonia del fuoco" (from music for the silent film Cabiria)
Charles Wakefield Cadman (1881–1946), American composer of 1 symphony (Pennsylvania Symphony)
Nancy Dalberg (1881–1949), Danish composer of 1 symphony (the first symphony written by a Danish female composer)
Sem Dresden (1881–1957), Dutch composer of 1 sinfonietta for clarinet and orchestra and 1 concertante symphony
George Enescu (1881–1955), Romanian violinist, pianist, cellist, conductor, teacher, and composer of 3 (acknowledged and complete) numbered symphonies, as well as 2 unfinished symphonies elaborated by Pascal Bentoiu as No. 4 and No. 5, respectively. (In addition, among the composer's juvenilia are 4 early "Study Symphonies".) Also symphonic are the Chamber Symphony, for 12 instruments, Op. 33 (1954), and the Symphonie concertante in B minor, for cello and orchestra, Op. 8 (1901).
Jan van Gilse (1881–1944), Dutch composer of 4 symphonies (No. 1, F major, 1901; No. 2, E-flat major, 1902; No. 3, Elevation, D minor, 1907; and No. 4, A major, 1915), of which the Third includes a part for soprano soloist; the composer also left sketches for a Fifth
Peder Gram (1881–1956), Danish composer of 3 symphonies
Edvin Kallstenius (1881–1967), Swedish composer of 5 symphonies and 4 sinfoniettas
Paul Le Flem (1881–1984), French composer of 4 symphonies
Nikolai Myaskovsky (1881–1950), Russian composer of 27 symphonies, as well as 3 sinfoniettas for strings.
Nikolai Roslavets (1881–1944), Russian composer of 1 symphony and 1 chamber symphony
Karl Weigl (1881–1949), Austrian composer of 6 symphonies
Marion Bauer (1882–1955), American composer of 1 symphony
Walter Braunfels (1882–1954), German composer of 1 symphony (Sinfonia brevis op. 69) plus a Sinfonia concertante for violin, viola, 2 horns and strings
Alf Hurum (1882–1972), Norwegian composer of a Symphony in D minor (1927)
Zoltán Kodály (1882–1967), Hungarian composer of 1 symphony
Gian Francesco Malipiero (1882–1973), Italian composer of 11 symphonies
Gino Marinuzzi (1882–1945), Italian composer of 1 symphony
Joseph Marx (1882–1964), Austrian composer of An Autumn Symphony (1921), the final movement of which the composer replaced in 1946 with the newly-composed tone poem Autumnal Revelries; also symphonic is the Sinfonia in modo classico, originally written for string quartet (1941) but later arranged for string orchestra in 1944
John Powell (1882–1963), American composer of a Symphony in A major, Virginia Symphony (1945, r. 1951)
Lazare Saminsky (1882–1959), Russian–American composer of 5 symphonies
Igor Stravinsky (1882–1971), Russian composer of 3 (purely orchestral) unnumbered symphonies, as well as the choral symphony Symphony of Psalms (1930, r. 1948)—see Category of Stravinsky symphonies. Finally, the chamber piece Symphonies of Wind Instruments (1920, r. 1947) uses the word 'symphony' in the old (Greek) sense of "sounding together."
Karol Szymanowski (1882–1937), Polish composer of 4 symphonies, of which the third (The Song of the Night, 1914–16) includes mixed chorus and a part for tenor (or soprano) soloist, while the fourth (Symphonie concertante, 1932) is a concertante work for piano and orchestra—see Category of Szymanowski symphonies.
Joaquín Turina (1882–1949), Spanish composer of "Sinfonía sevillana" (1920) and "Sinfonía del mar" (1945)
Hermann Wolfgang von Waltershausen (1882–1954), German composer of 1 symphony
Paul Hastings Allen (1883–1952), American composer of 8 symphonies
Sir Arnold Bax (1883–1953), English composer of 7 numbered symphonies, preceded by a Symphony in F major (completed piano score 1907; orchestrated in 2012–13 by Martin Yates); the tone poem Spring Fire (1913) is classified occasionally as an unnumbered, programmatic symphony. Bax also composed a Sinfonietta—see Category of Bax symphonies
Alfredo Casella (1883–1947), Italian composer of 3 symphonies (No. 1, B minor, 1906; No. 2, C minor, 1909; and No. 3, titled Sinfonia, 1940)
Sir George Dyson (1883–1964), English composer of 1 symphony, plus a Choral Symphony, composed in 1910 but not premiered until 2014.
Joseph Matthias Hauer (1883–1959), Austrian composer of 1 symphony and 1 sinfonietta
Manolis Kalomiris (1883–1962), Greek composer of 3 symphonies (No. 1, Leventia, for mixed chorus and orchestra, 1920, r. 1937, 1952; No. 2, Symphony of the Simple and Good People, for mezzo-soprano, mixed chorus, and orchestra, 1931; and No. 3, Palamiki, D minor, for reciter and orchestra, 1955)
Paul von Klenau (1883–1946), Danish composer of 9 symphonies
Alexander Krein (1883–1951), Russian composer of 1 symphony
Toivo Kuula (1883–1918), Finnish composer of an incomplete, projected Symphony, Op. 36 (1918), of which only the Introduction was sketched.
Maximilian Steinberg (1883–1946), Russian composer of 5 symphonies
Anton Webern (1883–1945), Austrian composer of 1 symphony (1928)
Boris Asafyev (1884–1949), Russian composer of 5 symphonies 
York Bowen (1884–1961), English composer of 3 symphonies, of which the third (1951) exists only in recorded form. (The score was lost in a publishing house flood.)
Louis Gruenberg (1884–1964), Russian–American composer of 5 symphonies
Arthur Meulemans (1884–1966), Belgian composer of 15 symphonies
Ture Rangström (1884–1947), Swedish composer of 4 symphonies (No. 1, August Strindberg in memoriam, C-sharp minor, 1914; No. 2, My Country, D minor, 1919; No. 3, Song under the Stars, D-flat major, in one movement, 1929; and No. 4, Invocatio, D minor, for organ and orchestra, 1936)
Albert Wolff (1884–1970), French conductor and composer of 1 symphony
Julio Fonseca (1885–1950), Costa Rican composer of the "Great Symphonic Fantasy on folk motifs"
Henri Collet (1885–1951), French composer of "Symphonie de l'Alhambra" (1947)
Dimitrie Cuclin (1885–1978), Romanian composer of 20 symphonies
Werner Josten (1885–1963), German–American composer of 1 symphony
Otto Klemperer (1885–1973), German conductor and composer of 6 symphonies
Artur Lemba (1885–1963), Estonian composer of 2 symphonies
Dora Pejačević (1885–1923), Croatian composer of a Symphony in F-sharp minor (1917, r. 1920)
Wallingford Riegger (1885–1961), American composer of 4 symphonies
Egon Wellesz (1885–1974), Austrian musicologist and composer of 9 symphonies
John J. Becker (1886–1961), American composer of 7 symphonies
Edward Joseph Collins (1886–1951), American composer of a Symphony in B minor, Nos habeit humus (1925) 
Marcel Dupré (1886–1971), French composer of a Symphony in G minor, for organ and orchestra (1927); also symphonic are two works for solo organ (Symphonie-Passion, 1924; and Symphony No. 2 in C-sharp minor, 1929) and a Sinfonia, for piano and organ (1946) 
Óscar Esplá (1886–1976), Spanish composer of 2 symphonies 
Wilhelm Furtwängler (1886–1954), German composer of 3 symphonies
Henri Gagnebin (1886–1977), Belgian–Swiss composer of 4 symphonies
Carlo Giorgio Garofalo (1886–1962), Italian composer of 2 symphonies
Jesús Guridi (1886–1961), Spanish composer of "Sinfonía pirenaica" ("Pyrenean Symphony", 1945)
Robert Heger (1886–1978), German conductor and composer of 3 symphonies
Jef van Hoof (1886–1959), Belgian composer of 6 symphonies
Paul Paray (1886–1979), French composer of 2 symphonies plus a "Symphonie d'archets" for string orchestra
Kosaku Yamada (1886–1965), First Japanese symphonic composer. He wrote 3 symphonies; the first being traditional, the second more akin of a symphonic poem and the third with Japanese traditional music and a voice. Finally there is also a choreographic symphony on a unrealized ballet titled "Maria Magdalena".
Kurt Atterberg (1887–1974), Swedish composer of 9 symphonies, of which the Ninth includes parts for mezzo-soprano, baritone, and mixed chorus; also symphonic is the Sinfonia for Strings (1953)
Josef Jonsson (1887-1969), Swedish composer of 3 symphonies (1919–22; 1931; 1947) and a chamber symphony (1949)
Oskar Lindberg (1887–1955), Swedish composer of the Symphony in F major (1916)
Leevi Madetoja (1887–1947), Finnish composer of 3 symphonies (No. 1, F major, 1916; No. 2, E-flat major, 1918; and No. 3, A major, 1926); an incomplete fourth symphony was lost when the composer was robbed in Paris—see Category of Madetoja symphonies
Ernest Pingoud (1887–1942), Finnish composer of 3 symphonies (1920; 1921; and 1927)
Florence Price (1887–1953), American composer of 4 symphonies, the second of which (c. 1935) is lost; her first (1932) is recognized as the first symphony by an African-American female composer
Yuri Shaporin (1887–1966), Russian composer of 2 symphonies 
Heinz Tiessen (1887–1971), German composer of 2 symphonies
Ernst Toch (1887–1964), Austrian composer of 7 symphonies
Max Trapp (1887–1971), German composer of 7 symphonies
Fartein Valen (1887–1952), Norwegian composer of 5 symphonies
Heitor Villa-Lobos (1887–1959), Brazilian composer of 12 symphonies, the fifth of which is lost. The third is for orchestra, brass band, and (optional) mixed chorus; similarly, the fourth is for orchestra, wind band, and concertino ensemble. Finally, the tenth is a 'symphony-oratorio' that includes mixed chorus and parts for tenor, baritone, and bass soloists—see Category of Villa-Lobos symphonies. In addition, the composer left two sinfoniette (1916 and 1947, respectively).
Anatoly Alexandrov (1888–1982), Russian composer of 2 symphonies
Emil Bohnke (1888–1928), German violist and composer of 1 symphony
Max Butting (1888–1976), German composer of 10 symphonies (the first for 16 instruments), plus a chamber symphony and 2 sinfoniettas (the first with banjo)
Philip Greeley Clapp (1888–1954), American composer of 12 symphonies
Luis Cluzeau Mortet (1888–1957), Uruguayan composer of 1 symphony
Piero Coppola (1888–1971), Italian conductor and composer of 1 symphony
Ilse Fromm-Michaels (1888–1986), German composer of 1 symphony
Victor Kolar (1888–1957), Hungarian–American composer of 1 symphony
Matthijs Vermeulen (1888–1967), Dutch composer of 7 symphonies
Cecil Armstrong Gibbs (1889–1960), English composer of 3 symphonies
Ina Boyle (1889–1967), Irish composer of 3 symphonies
Rudolf Mauersberger (1889–1971), German composer of 1 symphony
Vilém Petrželka (1889–1967), Czech composer of 4 symphonies and 2 sinfoniettas
Levko Revutsky (1889–1977), Ukrainian composer of 2 symphonies
Francisco Santiago (1889–1947), Filipino composer of "Taga-ilog", in 1938
Vladimir Shcherbachov (1889–1952), Russian composer of 5 symphonies
Rudolph Simonsen (1889–1947), Danish composer of 2 symphonies
Luís de Freitas Branco (1890–1955), Portuguese composer of 4 symphonies
Hans Gál (1890–1987), Austrian composer of 4 symphonies
Jacques Ibert (1890–1962), French composer of 1 symphony (Symphonie marine, 1931) and 1 concertante symphony for oboe and string orchestra 
Andrés Isasi (1890–1940), Spanish composer of 2 symphonies
Philip James (1890–1975), American composer of 2 symphonies and 1 sinfonietta
Frank Martin (1890–1974), Swiss composer of 1 symphony plus a Petite symphonie concertante for harp, harpsichord, piano and string orchestra
Bohuslav Martinů (1890–1959), Czech composer of 6 symphonies—see Category of Martinů symphonies.
Antoni Massana (1890–1966), Catalan composer of 1 symphony
Gösta Nystroem (1890–1966), Swedish composer of 6 symphonies: Sinfonia breve (1931); Sinfonia expressiva (1935–37); Sinfonia del mare (Symphony of the Sea), for soprano and orchestra (1948); Sinfonia Shakespeariana (1952); Sinfonia seria (1963); and Sinfonia tramontana (1965); also symphonic is the Sinfonia concertante, for cello and orchestra (1944, r. 1952) 
Wilhelm Petersen (1890–1957), German composer of 5 symphonies plus a sinfonietta for strings
Arthur Bliss (1891–1975), English composer of A Colour Symphony (1922) and the choral work Morning Heroes (1930), described as a "symphony for orator, chorus and orchestra".
Adolf Busch (1891–1952), German–Swiss violinist and composer of 1 symphony
Fidelio F. Finke (1891–1968), Czech–German composer of 1 symphony (Pan, 1919)
Frederick Jacobi (1891–1952), American composer of 2 symphonies
Karel Boleslav Jirák (1891–1972), Czech composer of 6 symphonies
Mihail Jora (1891–1971), Romanian composer of 1 symphony
Georges Migot (1891–1976), French composer of 13 symphonies plus a Petite symphonie for strings
Sergei Prokofiev (1891–1953), Russian composer of 7 symphonies, of which the fourth (Op. 47, 1929; revised as Op. 112, 1947) exists in two versions; plans to revise his second (Op. 40, 1924–25) went unrealized. In addition, two youth symphonies precede the numbered symphonies—see Category of Prokofiev symphonies. Also symphonic is the Symphony-Concerto for Cello and Orchestra in E minor, Op. 125 (1950–52) and the Sinfonietta in A major, Op. 5 (1909; later revised as Op. 48, 1929). 
Väinö Raitio (1891–1945), Finnish composer of a Symphony in G minor (1919)
Hendrik Andriessen (1892–1981), Dutch composer of 4 numbered symphonies and a Symphonia Concertante
Johanna Bordewijk-Roepman (1892–1971), Dutch composer of 1 symphony
Ettore Desderi (1892–1974), Italian composer of 1 symphony (Sinfonia davidica for soprano and baritone soloists, choir and orchestra)
Giorgio Federico Ghedini (1892–1965), Italian composer of 1 symphony (Symphonia, posthumous work)
Arthur Honegger (1892–1955), Swiss-French composer of 5 symphonies—see Category of Honegger symphonies.
Philipp Jarnach (1892–1982), German composer of a Sinfonia brevis
Jaroslav Kvapil (1892–1958), Czech composer of 4 symphonies
László Lajtha (1892–1963), Hungarian composer of 9 symphonies and 2 sinfoniettas
Arthur Lourié (1892–1966), Russian–American composer of 2 symphonies
Darius Milhaud (1892–1974), French composer of 12 numbered symphonies, 6 numbered chamber symphonies, an unnumbered Symphonie pour l'univers claudélien, and a Symphonie Concertante for four instruments and orchestra—see Category of Milhaud symphonies.
Miklós Radnai (1892–1935), Hungarian composer of 1 symphony for solo voices, chorus and orchestra (Symphony of the Magyars, 1921)
Hilding Rosenberg (1892–1985), Swedish composer of 8 symphonies
Kaikhosru Shapurji Sorabji (1892–1988), English composer of 12 symphonies: 7 for piano, 3 for organ, and 2 for piano, organ, chorus and large orchestra. The first of his piano symphonies ("No. 0") is the piano part of his otherwise unfinished 2nd Symphony for Orchestra.
Jean Absil (1893–1974), Belgian composer of 5 symphonies
Arthur Benjamin (1893–1960), Australian composer of 1 symphony (1944–45)
Eugene Goossens (1893–1962), British conductor and composer of 2 symphonies and a sinfonietta
Rued Langgaard (1893–1952), Danish composer of 16 symphonies, many of which he later revised. The third (La Melodia, 1915–16, r. 1925–33) is essentially a concertante work for piano and orchestra, while the fourteenth (Morgenen, 1947–48, r. 1951) includes mixed chorus; the sixteenth (Sørstormen, 1937, r. 1949) is for baritone soloist and male chorus.
Aarre Merikanto (1893–1958), Finnish composer of 3 symphonies (B minor, 1916; A major, War Symphony, 1918; and 1953)
Douglas Moore (1893–1969), American composer of 2 symphonies
Manuel Palau (1893–1967), Spanish composer of 3 symphonies
Bernard Rogers (1893–1968), American composer of 5 symphonies
Marcel Tyberg (1893–1944), Austrian composer of 3 symphonies
Ivan Wyschnegradsky (1893–1979), Russian–French composer of 2 symphonies (Ainsi parlait Zarathoustra for 4 pianos in quarter tones and Symphonie en un mouvement)
Ernest John Moeran (1893–1950), English composer of 2 symphonies and a sinfonietta. No.2 was left unfinished and completed by Martin Yates in 2011
Mihail Andricu (1894–1974), Romanian composer of 11 symphonies and 13 sinfoniettas
Robert Russell Bennett (1894–1981), American composer of 7 symphonies
Pavel Bořkovec (1894–1972), Czech composer of 3 symphonies
 Paul Dessau (1894–1979), German composer of 2 symphonies
Ludvig Irgens-Jensen (1894–1969), Norwegian composer of 1 symphony
Ernest John Moeran (1894–1950), British composer of 1 complete symphony, in G minor (1937), and a Sinfonietta; the composer also began, but failed to complete, a second symphony, in E-flat major (1947–50; elaborated in 2011 by Martin Yates).
Willem Pijper (1894–1947), Dutch composer of 3 symphonies
Walter Piston (1894–1976), American composer of 8 symphonies and a sinfonietta—see Category of Piston symphonies.
Erwin Schulhoff (1894–1942), Czech composer of 8 symphonies (the last 2 in short score)
Mark Wessel (1894–1973), American composer of 1 symphony and a Symphony Concertante for piano and horn with orchestra
Jenő Zádor (1894–1977), Hungarian–American composer of 4 symphonies
August Baeyens (1895–1966), Belgian composer of 8 symphonies plus 1 chamber symphony and a Sinfonia breve for small orchestra
Bjarne Brustad (1895–1978), Norwegian composer of 9 symphonies
Juan José Castro (1895–1968), Argentine composer of five symphonies
Georges Dandelot (1895–1975), French composer of 1 symphony
Johann Nepomuk David (1895–1977), Austrian composer of 8 symphonies, plus a Sinfonia preclassica, a Sinfonia breve for small orchestra and a symphony for strings
Paul Hindemith (1895–1963), German composer of at least eight works with descriptive titles designated symphonies or sinfoniettas. In chronological order these are the Lustige Sinfonietta of 1916, the Symphony: Mathis der Maler of 1931 (the best known of Hindemith's Symphonies), the Symphony in E-flat of 1939, the Symphonia Serena of 1946, the Sinfonietta in E of 1949, Die Harmonie der Welt Symphony and the Symphony in B-flat for Concert Band (both 1951) and the Pittsburgh Symphony of 1958.
Paul Höffer (1895–1949), German composer of 1 symphony (Sinfonie der grossen Stadt, 1937)
Gordon Jacob (1895–1984), British composer of two numbered symphonies, a Symphony AD 78 for band, A Little Symphony, Sinfonia Brevis, and a Symphony for Strings
Wilhelm Kempff (1895–1991), German pianist and composer of 2 symphonies
Borys Lyatoshynsky (1895–1968), Ukrainian composer of 5 symphonies
Henri Martelli (1895–1980), French composer of 3 symphonies
Slavko Osterc (1895–1941), Slovenian composer of 1 symphony
Karol Rathaus (1895–1954), Austrian–American composer of 3 symphonies
Kazimierz Sikorski (1895–1986), Polish composer of 4 symphonies
Leo Sowerby (1895–1968), American composer of 5 numbered orchestral symphonies, as well as a Symphony in G and Sinfonia brevis for organ
William Grant Still (1895–1978), American composer of 5 symphonies (No. 1, Afro-American, 1930, r. 1969; No. 2, Song of a New Race, 1937; No. 3, The Sunday Symphony, 1958; No. 4, Autochthonous, 1947; and No. 5, Western Hemisphere, 1945, r. 1970)
Walter Abendroth (1896–1973), German composer of 5 symphonies plus a sinfonietta
František Brož (1896–1962), Czech composer of 1 symphony
Eduard Erdmann (1896–1958), German composer of 4 symphonies
Jacobo Ficher (1896–1978), Argentine composer of 10 symphonies
Emil Frey (1896–1946), Swiss pianist and composer of 2 symphonies
Roberto Gerhard (1896–1970), Catalan composer, active in England, wrote 5 numbered symphonies (1952–69, the last unfinished), and a Symphony "Homenaje a Pedrell" (1940–41)
Howard Hanson (1896–1981), American composer of 7 symphonies (No. 1 Nordic, No. 2 Romantic—his most famous, No. 4 Requiem, No. 5 Sinfonia Sacra, and No. 7 Sea Symphony)
Jean Rivier (1896–1987), French composer of 8 symphonies, four of which are for string orchestra
Roger Sessions (1896–1985), American composer of 9 symphonies, all but the first 2 of which are written using some form of the twelve-tone technique—see Category of Sessions symphonies.
Bolesław Szabelski (1896–1979), Polish composer of 5 symphonies
Virgil Thomson (1896–1989), American composer of 3 symphonies
Wladimir Vogel (1896–1984), Russian–Swiss composer of 1 symphony (Sinfonia fugata, 1930–32)
Paul Ben-Haim (1897–1984), German-Israeli composer of 2 symphonies
Jørgen Bentzon (1897–1951), Danish composer of 2 symphonies
Matija Bravničar (1897–1977), Slovenian composer of 4 symphonies
Henry Cowell (1897–1965), American composer of 20 symphonies (a 21st exists only as sketches), as well as a Sinfonietta for chamber orchestra (1928) and an incomplete Symphonic Sketch (1943)
Oscar Lorenzo Fernández (1897–1948), Brazilian composer of 2 symphonies
John Fernström (1897–1961), Swedish composer of 12 symphonies
Ottmar Gerster (1897–1969), German composer of 4 symphonies
Hermann Heiss (1897–1966), German composer of 2 symphonies (Sinfonia giocosa and Sinfonia atematica)
Erich Wolfgang Korngold (1897–1957), Austrian-American composer of 1 symphony
György Kósa (1897–1984), Hungarian composer of 9 symphonies
Francisco Mignone (1897–1986), Brazilian composer of 3 orchestral symphonies and a chamber work titled Four Symphonies, for oboe, clarinet, and bassoon
Quincy Porter (1897–1966), American composer of 2 symphonies (1934; and 1962)
Jaroslav Řídký (1897–1956), Czech composer of 7 symphonies and 2 sinfoniettas
Knudåge Riisager (1897–1974), Danish composer of 5 symphonies
Harald Sæverud (1897–1992), Norwegian composer of 9 symphonies
Alexandre Tansman (1897–1986), Polish composer of 9 symphonies
Ernst Bacon (1898–1990), American composer of 4 symphonies
Emmanuel Bondeville (1898–1987), French composer of 2 symphonies
Marcel Delannoy (1898–1962), French composer of 2 symphonies
Norman Demuth (1898–1968), English composer of 1 symphony for string orchestra
Hanns Eisler (1898–1962), German composer of a Little Symphony (1932), a Chamber Symphony (1940) and a German Symphony for choir and orchestra (1930–1958)
Herbert Elwell (1898–1974), American composer of a Blue Symphony for soprano and string quartet
Roy Harris (1898–1979), American composer of 15 symphonies, of which Symphony No. 3 is by far the most famous
Tibor Harsányi (1898–1954), Hungarian–French composer of 1 symphony
Lev Knipper (1898–1874), Russian composer of 21 symphonies and 2 sinfoniettas
Marcel Mihalovici (1898–1985), Romanian–French composer of 5 symphonies
Karl Rankl (1898–1968), Austrian–British conductor and composer of 8 symphonies and 2 sinfoniettas
Vittorio Rieti (1898–1994), Italian–American composer of 11 symphonies
Viktor Ullmann (1898–1944), Czech composer of 2 symphonies (1944, both are reconstructions from the short score of the Piano Sonatas No. 5 and Piano Sonatas No. 7 by Bernard Wulff)
William Baines (1899–1922), English composer of 1 symphony
Radie Britain (1899–1994), American composer of 2 symphonies
Carlos Chávez (1899–1978), Mexican composer of 6 symphonies, as well as a "Dance Symphony" Caballos de vapor (AKA Horse Power), and a Sinfonía proletaria (proletarian symphony)—see Category of Chávez symphonies.
Sophie Carmen Eckhardt-Gramatté (1899–1974), Canadian composer of 2 symphonies and a Symphony-Concerto for piano and orchestra
William Levi Dawson (1899–1990), American composer of the "Negro Folk Symphony" (1934, r. 1952)
Pavel Haas (1899–1944), Czech composer of an unfinished Symphony (1940/41, orchestration completed by Zdenek Zouhar)
Eduardo Hernández Moncada (1899–1995), Mexican composer of 2 symphonies
Finn Høffding (1899–1997), Danish composer of 4 symphonies
Jón Leifs (1899–1968), Icelandic composer of 1 programmatic symphony, called Sögusinfónía (Saga Symphony)
Harl McDonald (1899–1955), American pianist, conductor, and composer of 4 symphonies
Alexander Tcherepnin (1899–1977), Russian composer of 4 symphonies
Randall Thompson (1899–1984), American composer of 3 symphonies
Pancho Vladigerov (1899–1978), Bulgarian composer of 2 symphonies (the second for strings)

1900–1949 
George Antheil (1900–1959), American composer of 10 symphonies, of which six are numbered (No. 1, Zingareska, 1920–22, r. 1923; No. 2, 1931–38, r. 1943; No. 3, American, 1936–41, r. 1946; No. 4, 1942, 1942; No. 5, Joyous, 1947–48; and No. 6, After Delacroix, 1947–48, r. 1949–50) and four are unnumbered (the Symphony for Five Instruments, 1923, r. 1923; the Jazz Symphony, for three pianos and orchestra, 1925, r. 1955; a Symphony in F major, 1925–26; and an alternative fifth symphony, Tragic Symphony, 1943–46, which Antheil composed as a requiem to the World War II dead)
Henry Barraud (1900–1997), French composer of 3 symphonies (the second for strings) and a Symphonie concertante for trumpet and orchestra
Nicolai Berezowsky (1900–1953), Russian–American violinist and composer of 4 symphonies
Willy Burkhard (1900–1955), Swiss composer of 1 symphony (Piccola sinfonia giocosa for small orchestra)
Alan Bush (1900–1995), British composer of 4 symphonies
Aaron Copland (1900–1990), American composer of 3 numbered symphonies, a Symphony for organ and orchestra (later arranged without organ as Symphony No. 1), and a Dance Symphony for orchestra. The fourth movement of No. 3 is based on his famous Fanfare for the Common Man
Pierre-Octave Ferroud (1900–1936), French composer of 1 symphony
Isadore Freed (1900–1960), American composer of 2 symphonies
Anis Fuleihan (1900–1970), Cypriot–American composer of 2 symphonies and a Concertante Symphony for string quartet and orchestra
Uuno Klami (1900–1961), Finnish composer of 2 numbered symphonies (1938; and 1945), as well as a Symphonie enfantine (1928)
Paul Kletzki (1900–1973), Polish conductor and composer of 3 symphonies plus a sinfonietta for strings
Ernst Krenek (1900–1991), Austrian composer of 5 symphonies
Colin McPhee (1900–1964), Canadian composer of 2 symphonies
Alexander Mosolov (1900–1973), Russian composer of 8 symphonies
Hermann Reutter (1900–1985), German composer of 1 symphony for strings plus a Hamlet–Sinfonie for soloists, narrator and orchestra
Lucijan Marija Škerjanc (1900–1973), Slovene composer of 5 symphonies plus a sinfonietta for strings
Carl Ueter (1900–1985), German composer of 2 symphonies
Kurt Weill (1900–1950), German composer of 2 symphonies
Kazimierz Wiłkomirski (1900–1995), Polish composer of 1 symphony and 1 Symphony concertante for cello and orchestra
David Wynne (1900–1983), Welsh composer of 4 symphonies (the last incomplete)
Karel Albert (1901–1987), Belgian composer of 4 symphonies plus 1 chamber symphony and 1 sinfonietta
Blaž Arnič (1901–1970), Slovenian composer of 9 symphonies
Julián Bautista (1901–1961), Spanish–Argentine composer of 1 symphony
Conrad Beck (1901–1989), Swiss composer of 7 symphonies
Werner Egk (1901–1983), German composer of 1 symphony (Kleine Symphonie, 1926)
Eivind Groven (1901–1977), Norwegian composer of 2 symphonies (No. 1, Towards the Mountains, 1937, r. 1951; and No. 2, The Midnight Hour, 1943)
Victor Hely-Hutchinson (1901–1947), British composer of 2 symphonies
Emil Hlobil (1901–1987), Czech composer of 7 symphonies and 1 sinfonietta
Hanns Jelinek (1901–1969), Austrian composer of 6 symphonies
Ernst Pepping (1901–1981), German composer of 3 symphonies
Marcel Poot (1901–1988), Belgian composer of 7 symphonies
Edmund Rubbra (1901–1986), English composer of 11 symphonies
Henri Sauguet (1901–1989), French composer of 4 symphonies
Henri Tomasi (1901–1971), French composer of 2 symphonies
Mark Brunswick (1902–1971), American composer of 1 symphony
Alfonso de Elías (1902–1984), Mexican composer of 3 symphonies
Helvi Leiviskä (1902–1982), Finnish composer of 3 symphonies and a Sinfonia brevis
Lino Liviabella (1902–1964), Italian composer of 1 symphony
Stefan Bolesław Poradowski (1902–1967), Polish composer of 8 symphonies
Vissarion Shebalin (1902–1963), Russian composer of 5 symphonies and 1 sinfonietta
John Vincent (1902–1977), American composer of 2 numbered symphonies and 1 earlier symphony (lost)
Arnold Walter (1902–1973), Austrian–Canadian composer of 1 symphony
Sir William Walton (1902–1983), English composer of 2 symphonies
Meredith Willson (1902–1984), American composer of 2 symphonies
Stefan Wolpe (1902–1972), German-born composer of a Symphony (1955–56)
Sir Lennox Berkeley (1903–1989), English composer of 4 symphonies
Boris Blacher (1903–1975), German composer of 2 symphonies
Vernon Duke (1903–1969), Russian–American composer of 3 symphonies
Antiochos Evangelatos (1903–1981), Greek composer of 2 symphonies and 1 sinfonietta
Jerzy Fitelberg (1903–1951), Polish–American composer of 2 symphonies, plus a symphony for strings and a sinfonietta
Vittorio Giannini (1903–1966), American composer of 5 symphonies
Pál Kadosa (1903–1983), Hungarian composer of 8 symphonies and 1 sinfonietta
Aram Khachaturian (1903–1978), Armenian composer of 3 symphonies
Mykola Kolessa (1903–2006), Ukrainian composer of 2 symphonies
Saburō Moroi (1903–1977), Japanese composer of 5 symphonies
Nicolas Nabokov (1903–1978), Russian–American composer of 3 symphonies
Priaulx Rainier (1903–1986), South African–British composer of 1 chamber symphony for strings
Günter Raphael (1903–1960), German composer of 5 symphonies plus a "Sinfonia breve"
Luis Humberto Salgado (1903–1977), Ecuadorian composer of 9 symphonies
John Antill (1904–1986), Australian composer of Symphony on a City (1959)
Victor Bruns (1904–1996), German composer of 6 symphonies, plus 1 chamber symphony for strings and 1 sinfonietta
Erik Chisholm (1904–1965), Scottish composer of 2 symphonies
Hubert Clifford (1904–1959), Australian–British composer of 1 symphony
Balys Dvarionas (1904–1972), Lithuanian composer of 1 symphony
Géza Frid (1904–1989), Hungarian–Dutch pianist and composer of 1 symphony and 1 sinfonietta for strings
Kunihiko Hashimoto (1904–1949), Japanese composer of 2 symphonies
Georges Hugon (1904–1980), French composer of 3 symphonies (the last unfinished)
Dmitry Kabalevsky (1904–1987), Russian composer of 4 symphonies
Iša Krejčí (1904–1968), Czech composer of 4 symphonies
Richard Mohaupt (1904–1957), German-U.S. composer of 1 symphony
Gavriil Popov (1904–1972), Russian composer of 7 symphonies (the last unfinished)
Cemal Reşit Rey (1904–1985), Turkish composer of 2 symphonies
Manuel Rosenthal (1904–2003), French composer of 2 symphonies
Reinhard Schwarz-Schilling (1904–1985), German composer of 2 symphonies
William Alwyn (1905–1985), English composer of 5 symphonies
Boris Arapov (1905–1992), Russian composer of 7 symphonies
Vytautas Bacevičius (1905–1970), Lithuanian composer of 6 symphonies
Theodor Berger (1905–1992), Austrian composer of 3 symphonies
Marc Blitzstein (1905–1961), American composer of 1 symphony (The Airborne Symphony, 1946, for narrator, vocal soloists, male chorus and orchestra)
Eugène Bozza (1905–1991), French composer of 5 symphonies
Yevgeny Brusilovsky (1905–1981), Russian composer of 8 symphonies
Francis Chagrin (1905–1972), Romanian–British composer of 2 symphonies
Christian Darnton (1905–1981), British composer of 4 symphonies
Ferenc Farkas (1905–2000), Hungarian composer of 1 symphony
Karl Amadeus Hartmann (1905–1963), German composer of 8 symphonies
André Hossein (1905–1983), Iranian–French composer of 3 symphonies
André Jolivet (1905–1974), French composer of 3 numbered symphonies and a symphony for strings 
Jef Maes (1905–1996), Belgian composer of 3 symphonies
Ernst Hermann Meyer (1905–1988), German composer of 3 symphonies (the first for strings) plus a concertante symphony for piano and orchestra and a sinfonietta
Léon Orthel (1905–1985), Dutch composer of 6 symphonies
Alan Rawsthorne (1905–1971), British composer of 3 symphonies
Marcel Rubin (1905–1995), Austrian composer of 10 symphonies plus a sinfonietta for strings
Verdina Shlonsky (1905–1990), Israeli composer of 1 symphony (1937)
Sir Michael Tippett (1905–1998), English composer of 4 symphonies
Eduard Tubin (1905–1982), Estonian composer of 11 symphonies, the last of which is incomplete. Also symphonic is the Sinfonietta on Estonian Motifs (1940).
Dag Wirén (1905–1986), Swedish composer of 5 numbered symphonies, Nos. 2–5 of which are extant (No. 2, 1939; No. 3, 1944; No. 4, 1952; and No. 5, 1964); the composer withdrew his First Symphony (1932) and it was never performed. Also symphonic is a Sinfonietta (1934)—see Category of Wirén symphonies
Xian Xinghai (1905–1945), Chinese composer of 2 symphonies
Kees van Baaren (1906–1970), Dutch composer of 1 symphony (1957)
Yves Baudrier (1906–1988), French composer of 1 symphony
Ivan Brkanović (1906–1987), Croatian composer of 5 symphonies
Pierre Capdevielle (1906–1969), French composer of 3 symphonies
Arnold Cooke (1906–2005), British composer of 6 symphonies
Paul Creston (1906–1985), American composer of 6 symphonies
Antal Doráti (1906–1988), American conductor and composer of Hungarian birth, who wrote 2 symphonies
Klaus Egge (1906–1979), Norwegian composer of 5 symphonies
Will Eisenmann (1906–1992), German–Swiss composer of 1 symphony for strings
Ulvi Cemal Erkin (1906–1972), Turkish composer of 2 symphonies plus a Sinfonietta for strings and a Symphony concertante for piano and orchestra
Ross Lee Finney (1906–1997), American composer of 4 symphonies
Benjamin Frankel (1906–1973), English composer of 8 symphonies
Janis Ivanovs (1906–1983), Latvian composer of 21 symphonies
Ingemar Liljefors (1906–1981), Swedish composer of 1 symphony
Fernando Lopes-Graça (1906–1994), Portuguese composer of 1 symphony and 1 sinfonietta
Peter Mieg (1906–1990), Swiss composer of 1 symphony
Alexander Moyzes (1906–1984), Slovak composer of 12 symphonies
Boris Papandopulo (1906–1991), Croatian composer of 2 symphonies plus a sinfonietta for strings
Dmitri Shostakovich (1906–1975), Soviet composer of 15 symphonies, of which a number have vocal parts: the second (To October, 1927) and third (First of May, 1929) include mixed chorus; the thirteenth (Babi Yar, 1962) includes parts for bass soloist and male chorus, while the fourteenth (1969) is for soprano and bass soloists—see Category of Shostakovich symphonies. Additionally, five of Shostakovich's String Quartets were arranged (with the composer's approval) for various combinations of instruments by Rudolf Barshai and styled "Chamber Symphonies".
Johannes Paul Thilman (1906–1973), German composer of 7 symphonies
David Van Vactor (1906–1994), American composer of 7 symphonies
Grace Williams (1906–1977), Welsh composer of 2 symphonies plus a "Sinfonia Concertante"
Konstantin Ivanov (1907-1984), Russian composer of 2 symphonies
Tony Aubin (1907–1981), French composer of 2 symphonies
Henk Badings (1907–1987), Dutch composer of 15 symphonies
Günter Bialas (1907–1995), German composer of 1 symphony (Sinfonia Piccola)
Yvonne Desportes (1907–1993), French composer of 3 symphonies
Wolfgang Fortner (1907–1987), German composer of 1 symphony plus a Sinfonia concertante
Camargo Guarnieri (1907–1993), Brazilian composer of 7 symphonies
Karl Höller (1907–1987), German composer of 2 symphonies and 2 little symphonies (op. 32a and 32b, from the two piano four hands little sonatas op. 32)
Dmitri Klebanov (1907–1987), Jewish Ukrainian composer of 9 symphonies
Elizabeth Maconchy (1907–1994), English composer of 2 symphonies (both withdrawn) plus a symphony for double string orchestra, a sinfonietta and a Little Symphony
Zygmunt Mycielski (1907–1987), Polish composer of 6 symphonies
Hisato Ōsawa (1907–1953), Japanese composer of at least 3 symphonies
Willem van Otterloo (1907–1978), Dutch conductor and composer of 1 symphony and a Symphonietta for winds
Roman Palester (1907–1989), Polish composer of 5 symphonies plus a sinfonietta for chamber orchestra
György Ránki (1907–1992), Hungarian composer of 2 symphonies
Miklós Rózsa (1907–1995), Hungarian-American composer of 1 symphony
Ahmet Adnan Saygun (1907–1991), Turkish composer of 5 symphonies
Martin Scherber (1907–1974), German composer of 3 symphonies
Menachem Avidom (1908–1995), Israeli composer of 10 symphonies
Jan Zdeněk Bartoš (1908–1981), Czech composer of 7 symphonies
Elliott Carter (1908–2012), American composer of 3 symphonies, including A Symphony of Three Orchestras (1976) and Symphonia: sum fluxae pretiam spei (1993–96)
Jean Coulthard (1908–2000), Canadian composer of 4 symphonies
Marin Goleminov (1908–2000), Bulgarian composer of 4 symphonies
Kurt Hessenberg (1908–1994), German composer of 4 symphonies, plus 1 symphony and 2 sinfoniettas for strings
Miloslav Kabeláč (1908–1979), Czech composer of 8 symphonies, including Symphony No. 8 Antiphonies.
Herman David Koppel (1908–1998), Danish composer of 7 symphonies
Lars-Erik Larsson (1908–1986), Swedish composer of 3 symphonies (No. 1, 1928; No. 2, 1937; and No. 3, 1945), as well as a Sinfonietta (1932)
Jean-Yves Daniel-Lesur (1908–2002), French composer of 2 symphonies
Nina Makarova (1908–1976), Russian composer of 1 symphony
Franco Margola (1908–1992), Italian composer of 3 symphonies and a symphony for strings
Olivier Messiaen (1908–1992), composer of Turangalîla-Symphonie (1946–48) in ten movements, with solo parts for piano and Ondes Martenot
Vano Muradeli (1908–1970), Georgian composer of 2 symphonies
Nikolai Rakov (1908–1990), Russian composer of 4 symphonies plus a sinfonietta for strings
Halsey Stevens (1908–1989), American composer of 2 symphonies
Geirr Tveitt (1908–1981), Norwegian composer of 2 symphonies plus a sinfonietta
John Verrall (1908–2001), American composer of 4 symphonies
William Wordsworth (1908–1988), English composer of 8 symphonies
Grażyna Bacewicz (1909–1969), Polish composer of 4 numbered symphonies plus a symphony and a sinfonietta, both for strings
Bruno Bjelinski (1909–1992), Croatian composer of 15 symphonies and 6 sinfoniettas
Paul Constantinescu (1909–1963), Romanian composer of 2 symphonies and 1 sinfonietta
Václav Dobiáš (1909–1978), Czech composer of 2 symphonies and 1 sinfonietta
Erwin Dressel (1909–1972), German composer of 4 symphonies
Harald Genzmer (1909–2007), German composer of 5 numbered symphonies, 1 chamber symphony and 3 sinfoniettas for strings plus a Sinfonia per giovani for orchestra and a Bremer Sinfonie
Vagn Holmboe (1909–1996), Danish composer of 13 numbered symphonies, the fourth of which (Sinfonia sacra, Op. 29, 1941) includes mixed chorus. Also symphonic is the Sinfonia in memoriam (Op. 65, 1955; originally presented as Holmboe's Ninth Symphony); four sinfonie for strings (Op. 72a–d, 1957–62), which can be played together as a unified piece, Kairos; three chamber symphonies (Op. 53, 1951; Op. 100, 1968; Op. 103a, 1970); four symphonic metamorphoses (the third, Epilog, Op. 80, 1962, too was originally presented as the Ninth Symphony); and, three 'lettered' youth symphonies (mostly incomplete). 
Arwel Hughes (1909–1988), Welsh composer of 1 symphony
Hanoch Jacoby (1909–1990), Israeli composer of 3 symphonies
Minna Keal (1909–1999), British composer of 1 symphony
Robin Orr (1909–2006), Scottish composer of 3 symphonies and a Sinfonietta Helvetica
Elie Siegmeister (1909–1991), American composer of 8 symphonies
Ādolfs Skulte (1909–2000), Latvian composer of 9 symphonies
Samuel Barber (1910–1981), American composer of 2 symphonies
Elsa Barraine (1910–1999), French composer of 2 symphonies
Miguel Bernal Jiménez (1910–1956), Mexican composer of 2 symphonies (Mexico and Hidalgo)
Henri Challan (1910–1977), French composer of 1 symphony
Aloys Fleischmann (1910–1992), Irish composer of 1 symphony
Werner Wolf Glaser (1910–2006), German–Swedish composer of 13 symphonies
Evgeny Golubev (1910–1988), Russian composer of 7 symphonies
Charles Jones (1910–1997), Canadian–American composer of 4 symphonies
Erland von Koch (1910–2009), Swedish composer of 6 symphonies (No. 1, 1938; No. 2, Sinfonia Dalecarlica, 1945; No. 3, 1948; No. 4, Sinfonia seria, 1953, r. 1962; No. 5, Lapponica, 1977; and No. 6, Salva la terra, 1992); also symphonic is the Sinfonietta (1949)
Rolf Liebermann (1910–1999), Swiss composer of 1 symphony 
Marijan Lipovšek (1910–1995), Slovenian composer of 1 symphony
Jean Martinon (1910–1976), French conductor and composer of 4 numbered symphonies plus a sinfonietta and a Symphonie de voyages
Alfred Mendelsohn (1910–1966), Romanian composer of 9 symphonies
Alex North (1910–1991), American composer of 2 symphonies
H. Owen Reed (1910–2014), American composer of 1 symphony
Yiannis Papaioannou (1910–1989), Greek composer of 5 symphonies
Ennio Porrino (1910–1959), Italian composer of 1 symphony
William Schuman (1910–1992), American composer of 10 symphonies
Robert Still (1910–1971), English composer of 4 symphonies
Josef Tal (1910–2008), Israeli composer of 6 symphonies
José Ardévol (1911–1981), Cuban composer of 3 symphonies
Stanley Bate (1911–1959), English composer of 4 symphonies and 2 sinfoniettas
Ján Cikker (1911–1989), Slovak composer of 3 symphonies and 1 sinfonietta
Helmut Degen (1911–1995), German composer of 1 chamber symphony
Bernard Herrmann (1911–1975), American composer of 1 symphony (1940)
Alan Hovhaness (1911–2000), American composer of 67 symphonies
Stefan Kisielewski (1911–1991), Polish composer of 3 symphonies (the last for 15 players)
Gian Carlo Menotti (1911–2007), Italian–American composer of 1 symphony (The Halcyon, 1976)
Anne-Marie Ørbeck (1911–1996), Norwegian composer of 1 symphony
Allan Pettersson (1911–1980), Swedish composer of 17 symphonies, his No.1 and No.17 were left in a fragmentary state, being completed by Christian Lindberg
Nino Rota (1911–1979), Italian composer of 3 symphonies and "Sinfonia sopra una Canzone d'Amore"
Mukhtar Ashrafi (1912–1975), Uzbek composer of 2 symphonies
Wayne Barlow (1912–1996), American composer of 1 chamber symphony
Roger Sacheverell Coke (1912–1972), English composer of 3 symphonies
Ingolf Dahl (1912–1970), German–American composer of 1 concertante symphony for two clarinets and orchestra and 1 sinfonietta for concert band
Don Gillis (1912–1978), American composer of 10 symphonies, plus a "Symphony No. 5 "
Rudolf Escher (1912–1980), Dutch composer of 2 numbered symphonies, an unfinished Symphony in memoriam Maurice Ravel, and a Symphony for 10 instruments
Jean Françaix (1912–1997), French composer of 1 symphony
Peggy Glanville-Hicks (1912–1990), Australian composer of a Sinfonietta (1935)
Robert Hughes (1912–2007), Scottish–Australian composer of 1 symphony and 1 sinfonietta
Daniel Jones (1912–1993), Welsh composer of 13 symphonies and 2 sinfoniettas
Jean-Louis Martinet (1912–2010), French composer of 1 symphony
Tauno Marttinen (1912–2008), Finnish composer of 10 symphonies
Xavier Montsalvatge (1912–2002), Catalan composer of "Sinfonía Mediterránea" (1948) and "Sinfonía de réquiem" (1985)
José Pablo Moncayo (1912–1958), Mexican composer of 2 symphonies (1944 and 1958, the latter unfinished), and a Sinfonietta (1945)
Vadim Salmanov (1912–1978), Russian composer of 4 symphonies plus a Little Symphony for strings and a Toy Symphony
Ma Sicong (1912–1987), Chinese composer of 2 symphonies
Bruno Bettinelli (1913–2004), Italian composer of 7 symphonies
Henry Brant (1913–2008), American composer of 5 unnumbered symphonies
Cesar Bresgen (1913–1988), Austrian composer of 1 symphony
Benjamin Britten (1913–1976), British composer of several symphonies, including A Simple Symphony for strings (1933–34), Sinfonia da Requiem (1939–40), a Spring Symphony (1948–49), and the Cello Symphony (1963), as well as a Sinfonietta (1932)
Norman Dello Joio (1913–2008), American composer of 1 symphony
Alvin Etler (1913–1973), American composer of 1 symphony
Morton Gould (1913–1996), American composer of 4 numbered symphonies (the last for band), plus 4 Symphonettes
Hans Henkemans (1913–1995), Dutch composer of 1 symphony (1934, subsequently withdrawn)
Tikhon Khrennikov (1913–2007), Russian composer of 3 symphonies
René Leibowitz (1913–1972), Polish–French composer of 1 symphony and 1 chamber sinfonietta
George Lloyd (1913–1998), English composer of 12 symphonies
Witold Lutosławski (1913–1994), Polish composer of 4 symphonies
Aleksandre Machavariani (1913–1995), Georgian composer of 7 symphonies
Jerome Moross (1913–1983), American composer of 1 symphony
Gardner Read (1913–2005), American composer of 4 symphonies
John Weinzweig (1913–2006), Canadian composer of 1 symphony
Walter Beckett (1914–1996), Irish composer of 1 symphony (Dublin Symphony for narrator, chorus and orchestra, 1989)
Norman Cazden (1914–1980), American composer of 2 symphonies
Natko Devčić (1914–1997), Croatian composer of 1 symphony
Cecil Effinger (1914–1990), American composer of 5 numbered symphonies and 2 "Little Symphonies"
Irving Fine (1914–1962), American composer of 1 symphony
Roger Goeb (1914–1997), American composer of 6 symphonies and 2 "sinfonias"
Cor de Groot (1914–1993), Dutch composer of 1 symphony
César Guerra-Peixe (1914–1993), Brazilian composer of 2 symphonies
Alexei Haieff (1914–1994), American composer of 3 symphonies
Hermann Haller (1914–2002), Swiss composer of 1 symphony
Akira Ifukube (1914–2006), Japanese composer of 1 symphony plus a Symphony Concertante for piano and orchestra
Jan Kapr (1914–1988), Czech composer of 10 symphonies
Dezider Kardoš (1914–1991), Slovak composer of 7 symphonies and 2 sinfoniettas
Rafael Kubelík (1914–1996), Czech–Swiss conductor and composer of 3 symphonies
Gail Kubik (1914–1984), American composer of 2 symphonies and a Sinfonia Concertante for piano, viola, trumpet, and orchestra
Riccardo Malipiero (1914–2003), Italian composer of 3 symphonies
 Sir Andrzej Panufnik (1914–1991), Polish composer of 10 symphonies
Stjepan Šulek (1914–1986), Croatian composer of 8 symphonies
Harold Truscott (1914–1992), British composer of a Symphony in E major (1949–50), as well as a now-lost Grasmere Symphony (1938)
David Diamond (1915–2005), American composer of 11 symphonies
Grigory Frid (1915–2012), Russian composer of 3 symphonies
Kurt Graunke (1915–2005), German composer of 9 symphonies
Marcel Landowski (1915–1999), French composer of 5 symphonies
Dorian Le Gallienne (1915–1963), Australian composer of a Symphony (1953) and a Sinfonietta (1956)
Douglas Lilburn (1915–2001), New Zealand composer of 3 symphonies
Robert Moffat Palmer (1915–2010), American composer of 2 symphonies
George Perle (1915–2009), American composer of a Short Symphony (1980) and 2 sinfoniettas
Vincent Persichetti (1915–1987), American composer of 9 symphonies
Humphrey Searle (1915–1982), British composer of 5 symphonies
Carlos Surinach (1915–1997), American composer of Catalan origin, he wrote 3 symphonies
Denis ApIvor (1916–2004), British composer of 5 symphonies
Karl-Birger Blomdahl (1916–1968), Swedish composer of 3 symphonies
Houston Bright (1916–1970), American composer of 1 symphony 
Peter Crossley-Holland (1916–2001), British composer of 1 symphony
Henri Dutilleux (1916–2013), French composer of 2 symphonies
Einar Englund (1916–1999), Finnish composer of 7 symphonies
Ellis Kohs (1916–2000), American composer of 2 symphonies
Tolia Nikiprowetzky (1916–1997), Russian–French composer of 1 symphony and 1 sinfonietta
Roh Ogura (1916–1990), Japanese composer of 1 symphony
Nikolay Peyko (1916–1995), Russian composer of 10 symphonies plus a sinfonietta and a Concerto–Symphony
Bernard Stevens (1916–1983), British composer of 2 symphonies
Richard Arnell (1917–2009), English composer of 6 symphonies
Anthony Burgess (1917–1993), British novelist and composer of 3 symphonies, of which only No.3 remains. He also wrote a Petite symphonie pour Strasbourg (1988), and a Sinfonietta for Liana (1990)
Edward T. Cone (1917–2004), American composer of 1 symphony
Roque Cordero (1917–2008), Panamanian composer of 4 symphonies
Robert Farnon (1917–2005), Canadian composer of 3 symphonies
John Gardner (1917–2011), English composer of 3 symphonies
Jovdat Hajiyev (1917–2002), Azerbaijani composer of 6 symphonies
Lou Harrison (1917–2003), American composer of 4 symphonies
Francis Jackson (1917–2022), British composer of 1 symphony
Ulysses Kay (1917–1995), American composer of 1 symphony and 1 sinfonietta
Robert Ward (1917–2013), American composer of 6 symphonies
Richard Yardumian (1917–1985), American composer of 2 symphonies
Isang Yun (1917–1995), Korean composer of 7 symphonies
Leonard Bernstein (1918–1990), American composer and conductor, composed 3 symphonies
Lorne Betts (1918–1985), Canadian composer of 2 symphonies
Harold Gramatges (1918–2008), Cuban composer of 1 symphony and a Sinfonietta
Argeliers León (1918–1991), Cuban composer of 2 numbered symphonies, as well as an unnumbered Symphony for Strings
A. J. Potter (1918–1980), Irish composer of 2 symphonies
Tauno Pylkkänen (1918–1980), Finnish composer of 1 symphony and 1 sinfonietta
George Rochberg (1918–2005), American composer of 6 symphonies
Bernd Alois Zimmermann (1918–1970), German composer of a Sinfonia prosodica (1945), as well as a Symphony in 1 movement (1947–51/53)
Carlos Enrique Vargas Méndez (1919–1998), Costa Rican composer of a symphonie
Jacob Avshalomov (1919–2013), American composer of 2 symphonies and 1 sinfonietta
Sven-Erik Bäck (1919–1994), Swedish composer of 2 string symphonies and 1 chamber symphony
Niels Viggo Bentzon (1919–2000), Danish composer of 24 symphonies
Lex van Delden (1919–1988), Dutch composer of 8 symphonies
Leif Kayser (1919–2001), Danish composer of 4 symphonies
Tālivaldis Ķeniņš (1919–2008), Latvian-born Canadian composer of 8 symphonies
Leon Kirchner (1919–2009), American composer of 1 symphony
Juan Orrego-Salas (1919–2019), Chilean composer of 5 numbered symphonies, plus a Symphony in One Movement "Semper reditus" (1997)
Cláudio Santoro (1919–1989), Brazilian composer of 14 symphonies
Galina Ustvolskaya (1919–2006), Russian composer of 5 symphonies
Mieczysław Weinberg (1919–1996), Polish composer who emigrated to the Soviet Union, composed 22 symphonies for full orchestra and 4 chamber symphonies. His No.22 was orchestrated by Kirill Umansky after the death of the composer.
Alexander Arutiunian (1920–2012), Armenian composer of 2 symphonies
Geoffrey Bush (1920–1998), British composer of 2 symphonies
Peter Racine Fricker (1920–1990), British composer of 5 symphonies
Karen Khachaturian (1920–2011), Armenian composer of 4 symphonies
John La Montaine (1920–2013), American composer of 2 symphonies
Aleksandr Lokshin (1920–1987), Russian composer of 11 symphonies plus 2 "Symphonietta"
Torbjörn Iwan Lundquist (1920-2000), Swedish composer of 9 symphonies
Ravi Shankar (1920–2012), Indian composer of 1 symphony
Harold Shapero (1920–2013), American composer of 1 symphony
Heikki Suolahti (1920–1936), Finnish composer of 1 symphony (Sinfonia piccola)
Douglas Allanbrook (1921–2003), American composer of 7 symphonies
Malcolm Arnold (1921–2006), British composer of 9 numbered symphonies, an unnumbered Symphony for Strings, Symphony for Brass, and Toy Symphony as well as three Sinfoniette.
Jack Beeson (1921–2010), American composer of 1 symphony
William Bergsma (1921–1994), American composer of 2 symphonies
Andrzej Dobrowolski (1921–1990), Polish composer of 1 symphony
Johannes Driessler (1921–1998), German composer of 3 symphonies
Hans Ulrich Engelmann (1921–2011), German composer of 1 symphony and 1 chamber symphony
Fritz Geißler (1921–1984), German composer, wrote 11 symphonies
Ruth Gipps (1921–1999), British composer of 5 symphonies
Karel Husa (1921–2016), American composer of Czech birth, composer of 2 symphonies
Andrew Imbrie (1921–2007), American composer of 3 symphonies
Joonas Kokkonen (1921–1996), Finnish composer of 5 symphonies (the last unfinished)
Robert Kurka (1921–1957), American composer of 2 symphonies
Edvard Mik'aeli Mirzoian (1921–2012), Armenian composer of 1 symphony
Ástor Piazzolla (1921–1992), Argentine composer of a Sinfonía Buenos Aires
Yves Ramette (1921–2012), French composer of 6 symphonies
Alfred Reed (1921–2005), American composer and conductor of Austrian descent, composed 5 symphonies, all for wind band
Leonard Salzedo (1921–2000), English composer of 2 symphonies and 2 sinfoniettas
Robert Simpson (1921–1997), British composer, wrote 11 symphonies
İlhan Usmanbaş (born 1921), Turkish composer of 3 symphonies
Gerard Victory (1921–1995), Irish composer of 4 symphonies
Irwin Bazelon (1922–1995), American composer of 9 symphonies
Lukas Foss (1922–2009), German–American composer of 4 symphonies
Iain Hamilton (1922–2000), Scottish composer of 4 symphonies plus a symphony for two orchestras and a sinfonia concertante for violin, viola and chamber orchestra
Ester Mägi (1922–2021), Estonian composer of 1 symphony
Finn Mortensen (1922–1983), Norwegian composer of 1 symphony
Kazimierz Serocki (1922–1981), Polish composer of 2 symphonies plus a sinfonietta for 2 string orchestras
John Veale (1922–2006), English composer of 3 symphonies
George Walker (1922–2018), American composer of 4 symphonies
Felix Werder (1922–2012), Australian composer of German origin, wrote 7 numbered symphonies (1943–92), a Sinfonia for viola, piano, and orchestra (1986), and a Wind Symphony (1990)
Raymond Wilding-White (1922–2001), British–American composer of 3 numbered symphonies plus a symphony for swing orchestra and a Symphony of Symphonies
James Wilson (1922–2005), Irish composer of 3 symphonies
Mario Zafred (1922–1987), Italian composer of 7 symphonies and a Sinfonietta, plus a Sinfonietta breve for strings
Zhu Jian'er (1922–2017), Chinese composer of 10 symphonies
Arthur Butterworth (1923–2014), English composer of 7 symphonies
Frank William Erickson (1923–1996), American composer of 3 symphonies
Viktor Kalabis (1923–2006), Czech composer of 5 symphonies
William Kraft (1923–2022), American composer of 1 symphony
Peter Mennin (1923–1983), American composer, wrote 9 symphonies
Vasilije Mokranjac (1923–1984), Serbian composer of 5 symphonies and a Sinfonietta for strings
Daniel Pinkham (1923–2006), American composer of 4 symphonies
Ned Rorem (1923–2022), American composer of 3 numbered orchestral symphonies, a symphony for winds and a symphony for strings
James Stevens (1923–2012), English composer of 4 symphonies
Lester Trimble (1923–1986), American composer of 3 symphonies
Warren Benson (1924–2005), American composer of 2 symphonies
Ikuma Dan (1924–2001), Japanese composer of 6 symphonies, 7th unfinished
Heimo Erbse (1924–2005), German composer of 5 symphonies plus a Sinfonietta giocosa
Egil Hovland (1924–2013), Norwegian composer of 3 symphonies (the third for reciter, choir and orchestra)
Benjamin Lees (1924–2010), American composer of 5 symphonies
Franco Mannino (1924–2005), Italian composer of 12 symphonies
Sergiu Natra (1924–2021), Romanian–Israeli composer of 3 symphonies and 1 symphony for strings
Serge Nigg (1924–2008), French composer of 1 symphony (Jérôme Bosch, 1960)
Mikhaïl Nosyrev (1924–1981), Russian composer of 4 symphonies
Else Marie Pade (1924–2016), Danish composer of 2 symphonies
Joly Braga Santos (1924–1988), Portuguese composer of 6 symphonies
Ernest Tomlinson (1924–2015), English composer of 2 symphonies
Yasushi Akutagawa (1925–1989), Japanese composer of 1 numbered symphony (1954), plus a Symphony "Twin Stars", for children (1957) and the Ellora Symphony (1958)
Jurriaan Andriessen (1925–1996), Dutch composer of 8 numbered symphonies, plus a Symphonietta concertante, for four trumpets and orchestra (1947), and a Sinfonia "Il fiume" for winds (1984)
Mikis Theodorakis (1925–2021), Greek composer of 5 symphonies; No.1 (1953), No.2 The Song of the Earth (1981), No.3 (1981), No.7 Spring-Symphony(1983) and No.4 Of the Choral Odes (1986–1987). He also wrote a sinfonietta (1995)
Robert Beadell (1925–1994), American composer of 2 symphonies
Gustavo Becerra-Schmidt (1925–2010), Chilean composer of 3 symphonies
Luciano Berio (1925–2003), Italian composer of the famous Sinfonia (1968–69)
Aldo Clementi (1925–2011), Italian composer of 1 chamber symphony
Marius Constant (1925–2004), Romanian–French composer of 3 symphonies (the first is scored for wind instruments)
Georges Delerue (1925–1992), French composer of 1 concertante symphony for piano and orchestra
Andrei Eshpai (1925–2015), Russian composer of 9 symphonies
Bertold Hummel (1925–2002), German composer of 3 symphonies
Giselher Klebe (1925–2009), German composer of 8 symphonies plus a Ballettsinfonie (Das Testament op. 61, 1971)
Włodzimierz Kotoński (1925–2014), Polish composer of 2 symphonies
Ivo Malec (1925–2019), Croatian–French composer of 1 symphony
Kirke Mechem (born 1925), American composer of 2 symphonies
Anthony Milner (1925–2002), British composer of 3 orchestral symphonies and a symphony for organ
Julián Orbón (1925–1991), Spanish composer of 1 symphony
Boris Parsadanian (1925–1997), Armenian–Estonian composer of 11 symphonies
Gunther Schuller (1925–2015), American composer of 3 symphonies, a Symphony for Organ, and a Chamber Symphony (1989)
Boris Tchaikovsky (1925–1996), Soviet composer of 3 symphonies and a Symphony with Harp
Paul W. Whear (1925–2021), American composer of 4 symphonies
Čestmír Gregor (1926–2011), Czech composer of 5 symphonies, he also wrote two sinfoniettas
Louis Calabro (1926–1991), American composer of 3 symphonies
Edwin Carr (1926–2003), New Zealand composer of 4 symphonies and 1 sinfonietta
Jacques Castérède (1926–2014), French composer of 2 symphonies (the first for strings)
Barney Childs (1926–2000), American composer of 2 symphonies
Hans Werner Henze (1926–2012), German composer of 10 symphonies
Ben Johnston (1926–2019), American composer of a Symphony in A (1987) and a Chamber Symphony (1990)
François Morel (1926–2018), Canadian composer of 1 symphony for brass
Clermont Pépin (1926–2006), Canadian composer of 5 symphonies
Anatol Vieru (1926–1998), Romanian composer of 7 symphonies
Paul Angerer (1927–2017), Austrian composer of 4 symphonies
Pascal Bentoiu (1927–2016), Romanian composer of 8 symphonies
Gunnar Bucht (born 1927), Swedish composer of 16 symphonies
Franco Donatoni (1927–2000), Italian composer of 2 symphonies (the first for strings, the second for chamber orchestra). Another work, Souvenir (1967), is subtitled Kammersymphonie
Donald Erb (1927–2008), American composer of a Symphony of Overtures (1964)
Walter Hartley (1927–2016), American composer of 21 symphonies for different ensembles (from small wind ensembles to full orchestra) plus 2 Sinfonia concertante for wind and percussion, 2 sinfoniettas and 1 chamber symphony
Wilfred Josephs (1927–1997), British composer of 12 symphonies
John Joubert (1927–2019), British composer of 2 symphonies
Wilhelm Killmayer (1927–2017), German composer of 3 symphonies
Richard Nanes  (1927–2009), American composer of 4 symphonies
Graham Whettam (1927–2007), English composer of 9 symphonies plus a sinfonietta for strings
Thomas Wilson (1927–2001), Scottish composer of American birth, composed 5 symphonies between 1955 and 1998 and a Chamber Symphony (1990)
Samuel Adler (born 1928), German-born American composer of 6 symphonies
Tadeusz Baird (1928–1981), Polish composer of 3 symphonies
James Cohn (1928–2021), American composer of 8 symphonies
Jean-Michel Damase (1928–2013), French composer of 1 symphony
George Dreyfus (born 1928), Australian composer of 2 symphonies (1967 and 1976), and a Symphonie Concertante for bassoon, violin, viola, cello, and string orchestra (1978)
Nicolas Flagello (1928–1994), American composer of 2 symphonies
Robert Helps (1928–2001), American pianist and composer of 2 symphonies
Guo Zurong (born 1928), Chinese composer of 33 symphonies
Zdeněk Lukáš (1928–2007), Czech composer of 7 symphonies
Einojuhani Rautavaara (1928–2016), Finnish composer of 8 symphonies, the first having up to 3 different versions
William Russo (1928–2003), American composer of 2 symphonies
Yevgeny Svetlanov (1928–2002), Russian conductor and composer of a Symphony (1956)
Raymond Warren (born 1928), British composer of 3 symphonies
Carmelo Bernaola (1929–2002), Spanish composer of 3 symphonies
Philip Cannon (1929–2016), British composer of 1 symphony and 1 sinfonietta
Edison Denisov (1929–1996), Russian composer of 2 symphonies
Alun Hoddinott (1929–2008), Welsh composer of 10 numbered symphonies (the first withdrawn), 3 sinfoniettas, a Sinfonia for Strings and Sinfonia Fidei for Soprano, Tenor, Chorus and Orchestra.
Donald Keats (1929–2018), American composer of 2 symphonies
Kenneth Leighton (1929–1988), British composer of 3 symphonies plus a "Symphony for Strings"
Teizo Matsumura (1929–2007), Japanese composer of 2 symphonies
Toshiro Mayuzumi (1929–1997), Japanese composer of a "Nirvana Symphony" (1958) and a "Mandala Symphony" (1960)
Robert Muczynski (1929–2010), American composer of 2 symphonies
Bogusław Schaeffer (1929–2019), Polish composer of 4 symphonies
Hans Stadlmair (1929–2019), Austrian composer of a Sinfonia serena for strings
Avet Terterian (1929–1994), Armenian composer of 9 symphonies, the last unfinished
Akio Yashiro (1929–1976), Japanese composer of 1 symphony
Friedrich Gulda (1930–2000), Austrian composer of a Jazz Symphony
David Amram (born 1930), American composer of 1 symphony
John Davison (1930–1999), American composer of 6 symphonies
Richard Felciano (born 1930), American composer of 1 symphony for strings
Jean Guillou (1930–2019), French composer of 3 symphonies
Nikolai Karetnikov (1930–1994), Russian composer of 4 symphonies and 2 chamber symphonies
Günter Kochan (1930–2009), German composer of 6 symphonies
Dieter Schnebel (1930–2018), German composer of 1 symphony (Sinfonie X)
Eino Tamberg (1930–2010), Estonian composer of 4 symphonies
Gil Trythall (born 1930), American composer of 1 symphony plus a Sinfonia concertante
Donald Harris (1931–2016), American composer of 2 symphonies
Anthony Hedges (1931–2019), English composer of 2 symphonies and 1 concertante symphony
Ib Nørholm (1931–2019), Danish composer of 13 symphonies
Malcolm Williamson (1931–2003), Australian composer of 7 numbered symphonies, as well as a Symphony for Organ (1960), a Sinfonia Concertante for three trumpets, piano and strings (1960–62), a Symphony for Voices (1962), and a Choral Symphony "The Dawn is at Hand" (1989)
John Barnes Chance (1932–1972), American composer of 2 symphonies
James Douglas (1932–2022), Scottish composer of 15 symphonies
Alexander Goehr (born 1932), British composer of German birth, wrote a Little Symphony (1963), Symphony in One Movement (1969/81), a Sinfonia for chamber orchestra (1979), and Symphony with Chaconne (1985–86)
Pelle Gudmundsen-Holmgreen (1932–2016), Danish composer of 1 symphony Symfoni, Antifoni (1977)
John Kinsella (1932–2021), Irish composer of 11 symphonies
Henri Lazarof (1932–2013), Bulgarian composer of 7 symphonies
Malcolm Lipkin (1932–2017), English composer of 3 symphonies
Martin Mailman (1932–2000), American composer of 3 symphonies and 1 sinfonietta
Richard Meale (1932–2009), Australian composer of 1 symphony (1994)
Per Nørgård (born 1932), Danish composer of 8 symphonies
Rodion Shchedrin (born 1932), Russian composer of 3 symphonies
Robert Sherlaw Johnson (1932–2000), British composer of 1 symphony
Sergei Slonimsky (1932–2020), Russian composer of 34 symphonies
Claude Thomas Smith (1932–1987), American composer of 1 symphony
Alan Stout (1932–2018), American composer of 4 symphonies
John Williams (born 1932), American composer and conductor. He wrote a "Symphony" (1966) and a "Sinfonietta for Wind Ensemble" (1968)
Hugh Wood (1932–2021), British composer of 1 symphony (1982)
Iosif Andriasov (1933–2000), Armenian-Russian composer of 2 symphonies
Leonardo Balada (born 1933), American composer of Spanish birth, has written 6 symphonies
Easley Blackwood (1933–2023), American composer of 5 symphonies
Seóirse Bodley (born 1933), Irish composer of 5 symphonies and a Chamber Symphony
Ramiro Cortés (1933–1984), American composer of a Sinfonia Sacra (1954/59)
Pozzi Escot (born 1933), American composer of 6 symphonies
Henryk Górecki (1933–2010), Polish composer of 4 symphonies
Toshi Ichiyanagi (1933–2022), Japanese composer of 6 symphonies and 2 chamber symphonies
W. Francis McBeth (1933–2012), American composer of 4 symphonies
Krzysztof Penderecki (1933–2020), Polish composer of 8 symphonies
Vladimir Dashkevich (born 1934), Russian composer of 5 symphonies
Anthony Gilbert (born 1934), British composer of 1 symphony
Alemdar Karamanov (1934–2007), Ukrainian composer of 24 symphonies
William Mathias (1934–1992), Welsh composer of 3 symphonies
Siegfried Matthus (1934–2021), German composer of 3 symphonies
Sir Peter Maxwell Davies (1934–2016), British Composer of a Sinfonia (1962), a Sinfonia Concertante (1982), a Sinfonietta (1983) and 10 numbered symphonies (1976–2013), the last of which includes a chorus and baritone soloist
Claudio Prieto (1934–2015), Spanish composer of 4 symphonies
Bernard Rands (born 1934), British–American composer of 1 symphony
Alan Ridout (1934–1996), British composer of 8 symphonies and 1 sinfonietta
Alfred Schnittke (1934–1998), Russian composer of 10 symphonies (including symphony No."0"). No.9 was left unfinished and completed by Alexander Raskatov
Richard Wernick (born 1934), American composer of 2 symphonies
Nigel Butterley (1935–2022), Australian composer of 1 symphony (1980)
Samuel Jones (born 1935), American composer of 3 symphonies
Giya Kancheli (1935–2019), Georgian composer of 7 symphonies
Carlo Martelli (born 1935), English composer of 1 symphony
Nicholas Maw (1935–2009), British composer of 1 symphony for chamber orchestra
Arvo Pärt (born 1935), Estonian composer of 4 symphonies
Aulis Sallinen (born 1935), Finnish composer of 8 symphonies
Kurt Schwertsik (born 1935), Austrian composer of 3 symphonies
Josep Soler i Sardà (1935–2022), Spanish composer of 8 symphonies
David Blake (born 1936), English composer of 1 chamber symphony
Iván Erőd (1936–2019), Hungarian–Austrian pianist and composer of 2 symphonies
Vyacheslav Ovchinnikov (1936–2019), Russian composer of 4 symphonies
Richard Rodney Bennett (1936–2012), English composer of 3 symphonies and a sinfonietta
Erich Urbanner (born 1936), Austrian composer of 1 symphony plus a concertante symphony and a sinfonietta (both for chamber orchestra)
John White (born 1936), English composer of 25 symphonies
Osvaldas Balakauskas (born 1937), Lithuanian composer of 5 symphonies
David Bedford (1937–2011), English composer of 2 symphonies plus a Symphony for 12 musicians
Gordon Crosse (1937–2021), English composer of 2 symphonies
Philip Glass (born 1937), American composer of 12 symphonies (as of 2019)
Milcho Leviev (1937–2019), Bulgarian composer of 1 symphony
Valentyn Silvestrov (born 1937), Ukrainian composer of 7 symphonies
Loris Tjeknavorian (born 1937), Iranian-Armenian conductor and composer of 5 symphonies
Wang Xilin (born 1937), Chinese composer of at 7 symphonies
Elizabeth R. Austin (born 1938), American composer of 2 symphonies
Howard Blake (born 1938), English composer of 2 symphonies
William Bolcom (born 1938), American pianist and composer of 6 symphonies
Youri Boutsko (1938–2015), Russian composer of 13 symphonies
Gloria Coates (born 1938), American composer of 16 symphonies
John Corigliano (born 1938), American composer of 3 symphonies
John Harbison (born 1938), American composer of 6 symphonies
Paavo Heininen (1938–2022), Finnish composer of 6 symphonies
Frederic Rzewski (1938–2021), American composer of a Scratch Symphony (1997)
José Serebrier (born 1938), Uruguayan composer of 3 symphonies
Christopher Steel (1938–1991), British composer of 7 symphonies
Charles Wuorinen (1938–2020), American composer of 8 numbered symphonies and a Microsymphony (1992)
Louis Andriessen (1939–2021), Dutch composer of De negen symfonieën van Beethoven, for orchestra and ice-cream vendor's bell (1970), Symfonieën der Nederlanden, for two or more wind bands (1974), and Symphony for Open Strings for 12 solo strings (1978)
Robert Jager (born 1939), American composer of 2 symphonies and a sinfonietta
Jaroslav Krček (born 1939), Czech composer of 6 symphonies
Robert Matthew-Walker (born 1939), English composer of 8 symphonies and 1 sinfonietta
John McCabe (1939–2015), English composer of 5 numbered symphonies, plus a Six-minute Symphony for strings
Patric Standford (1939–2014), English composer of 5 symphonies
Tomáš Svoboda (1939–2022), Czech-American composer of 6 symphonies
Boris Tishchenko (1939–2010), Russian composer of 7 symphonies plus a "French Symphony", "Sinfonia Robusta", the Choreo-symphonic cycle of "Beatrice" (5 symphonies), and a "Pushkin Symphony"
Margaret Lucy Wilkins (born 1939), English composer of 1 symphony
Ellen Taaffe Zwilich (born 1939), American composer of 5 symphonies
Alireza Mashayekhi (born 1940), Iranian composer of 9 symphonies
Tilo Medek (1940–2006), German composer of 3 symphonies
Stephen Albert (1941–1992), American composer of 2 symphonies (the second with orchestration completed by Sebastian Currier)
Judith Margaret Bailey (born 1941), English composer of 2 symphonies
Derek Bourgeois (1941–2017), British composer of 114 symphonies
Sebastian Forbes (born 1941), British composer of 1 symphony
Friedrich Goldmann (1941–2009), German composer of 4 numbered symphonies and 4 unnumbered symphonies plus a sinfonietta and Quasi una sinfonia
Adolphus Hailstork (born 1941), American composer of 3 symphonies
John Melby (born 1941), American composer of 2 symphonies
Gillian Whitehead (born 1941), New Zealand–born Australian composer of 1 symphony
Richard Edward Wilson (born 1941), American composer of 3 symphonies
Philip Bračanin (born 1942), Australian composer of 6 symphonies
Volker David Kirchner (1942–2020), German composer of 2 symphonies
Tomás Marco (born 1942), Spanish composer of 9 symphonies
Edward Cowie (born 1943), English composer of 2 symphonies
Ross Edwards (born 1943), Australian composer of 4 symphonies
Robin Holloway (born 1943), English composer of 2 symphony (the first, Clarissa Symphony, for soprano, tenor and orchestra)
Shin'ichirō Ikebe (born 1943), Japanese composer of 7 symphonies
Ilaiyaraaja (born 1943), Indian composer of 1 symphony
David Maslanka (1943–2017), American composer of 10 symphonies
David Matthews (born 1943), English composer of 9 symphonies
Krzysztof Meyer (born 1943), Polish composer of 9 symphonies plus an unnumbered Symphony in Mozartean style
Joseph Schwantner (born 1943), American composer of 1 symphony
Roger Smalley (1943–2015), English composer of 1 symphony (1979–81)
William Albright (1944–1998), American composer of a Symphony for Organ and Percussion
Frank Corcoran (born 1944), Irish composer of 4 symphonies
Michael Garrett (born 1944), British composer of 13 symphonies and 13 concertante symphonies 
Christopher Gunning (born 1944), British composer of 12 symphonies
Pehr Henrik Nordgren (1944–2008), Finnish composer of 8 symphonies plus a symphony for strings and a chamber symphony
Rhian Samuel (born 1944), Welsh composer of an "Elegy-Symphony"
Leif Segerstam (born 1944), Finnish composer of 300 symphonies, the all-time record as of 2015
Jerome de Bromhead (born 1945), Irish composer of 2 symphonies
Gerd Domhardt (1945–1997), German composer of 2 symphonies and 2 chamber symphonies
Edward Gregson (born 1945), English composer of 1 symphony for brass band
Judith Lang Zaimont (born 1945), American composer of 2 numbered symphonies, plus a "dance symphony" titled Hidden Heritage and a Symphony for wind orchestra in three scenes (2003)
Thomas Pasatieri (born 1945), American composer of 3 symphonies
Arnold Rosner (1945–2013), American composer of 6 symphonies
Alexey Rybnikov (born 1945), Russian composer of 6 symphonies
Ragnar Søderlind (born 1945), Norwegian composer of 8 symphonies
Martin Bresnick (born 1946), American composer of 1 symphony
Tsippi Fleischer (born 1946), Israeli composer of 5 symphonies
Tristan Keuris (1946–1996), Dutch composer of a "Sinfonia" (1972–1974), and "Symphony in D" (1995)
Ladislav Kubík (1946–2017), Czech-American composer of 3 sinfoniettas
Ulrich Leyendecker (1946–2018), German composer of 5 symphonies
Richard St. Clair (born 1946), American composer of 1 symphony
Giles Swayne (born 1946), British composer of 2 symphonies
Pēteris Vasks (born 1946), Latvian composer of 3 symphonies
Heinz Winbeck (1946–2019), German composer of 5 symphonies, the first premiered in 1984, the fifth in 2010, the third including text of Georg Trakl for alto and speaker
John Adams (born 1947), American composer who has used the term 'Symphony' to describe a number of works, including the Chamber Symphony (1992) and its sequel Son of Chamber Symphony (2007), the Dr. Atomic Symphony (2007), drawn from his opera of the same name, and Scheherazade.2, a "dramatic symphony" for violin and orchestra.
Jack Gallagher (born 1947), American composer of 2 symphonies and 1 sinfonietta
Nikolai Korndorf (1947–2001), Russian–Canadian composer of 4 symphonies
Paul Patterson (born 1947), British composer of 1 symphony for strings
Emil Tabakov (born 1947), Bulgarian composer of 10 symphonies
Claude Baker (born 1948), American composer of 1 symphony
Ioseb Bardanashvili (born 1948), Georgian–Israeli composer of 3 symphonies
Glenn Branca (1948–2018), American composer and guitarist, who composed 12 symphonies, 9 of them for ensembles of electric guitars and percussion
Stephen Brown (born 1948), Canadian composer of 3 symphonies: The Northern Journey (1986-2019), Fear and Loathing (2019), Combustion (2020)
Diana Burrell (born 1948), English composer of 1 symphony (Symphonies of Flocks, Herds and Shoals, 1995–96)
Carlos Franzetti (born 1948), Argentinian composer of 2 symphonies
Mikko Heiniö (born 1948), Finnish composer of 2 symphonies
Jonathan Lloyd (born 1948), British composer of 5 symphonies
Edward McGuire (born 1948), Scottish composer of 3 symphonies
Julia Tsenova (1948–2010), Bulgarian composer of Sinfonia con piano concertante (1974)
Dan Welcher (born 1948), American conductor and composer of 5 symphonies
Kalevi Aho (born 1949), Finnish composer of 17 symphonies and 3 chamber symphonies
James Barnes (born 1949), American composer of 5 symphonies
Hiro Fujikake (born 1949), Japanese composer of 3 symphonies
Eduard Hayrapetyan (born 1949), Armenian composer of 3 symphonies
Richard Mills (born 1949), Australian composer of 2 symphonies
Stephen Paulus (1949–2014), American composer of 2 symphonies (the second for strings) and 2 sinfoniettas
Shulamit Ran (born 1949), Israeli–American composer of 1 symphony
Christopher Rouse (1949–2019), American composer of 6 symphonies
Poul Ruders (born 1949), Danish composer of 5 symphonies
Manfred Trojahn (born 1949), German composer of 5 symphonies

1950–present 
Andrew Downes (born 1950), British composer of 5 symphonies
Otomar Kvěch (1950–2018), Czech composer of 5 symphonies
Libby Larsen (born 1950), American composer of 7 symphonies 
Stephen Oliver (1950–1992), English composer of 1 symphony
Jay Reise (born 1950), American composer of 3 symphonies
Glenn Stallcop (born 1950), American Composer of 15 symphonies
Lepo Sumera (1950–2000), Estonian composer of 6 symphonies and 1 symphony for string orchestra and percussion
Alan Belkin (born 1951), Canadian composer of 8 symphonies
John Buckley (born 1951), Irish composer of 1 symphony
Gareth Glyn (born 1951), Welsh composer of 1 symphony
Brian M. Israel (1951–1986), American composer of 6 symphonies
Anthony Korf (born 1951), American composer of 3 symphonies
Gerald Levinson (born 1951), American composer of 2 symphonies
Michael Rosenzweig (born 1951), South African composer of 1 symphony and 2 sinfoniettas
Craig H. Russell (born 1951), American composer of 2 symphonies
Philip Sawyers (born 1951), British composer of 5 symphonies
Roger Briggs (born 1952), American composer of 2 symphonies
Alexander Brincken (born 1952), Russian composer of 5 symphonies
Brenton Broadstock (born 1952), Australian composer of 5 symphonies
Stephen Hartke (born 1952), American composer of 4 symphonies
Oliver Knussen (1952–2018), English conductor and composer of 3 symphonies
Alla Pavlova (born 1952), Russian composer of 11 symphonies
Wolfgang Rihm (born 1952), German composer of 3 numbered and 2 unnumbered symphonies
Cindy McTee (born in 1953), American composer of 1 symphony
Daniel Asia (born 1953), American composer of 6 symphonies
Johan de Meij (born 1953), Dutch composer of 4 symphonies
Akira Nishimura (born 1953), Japanese composer of 3 symphonies and 3 chamber symphonies
Anthony Powers (born 1953), British composer of 2 symphonies
Robert Saxton (born 1953), British composer of 1 chamber symphony
Wolfgang von Schweinitz (born 1953), German composer of 2 symphonies plus a Plainsound–Sinfonie for basset clarinet, ensemble and orchestra
Roberto Sierra (born 1953), Puerto Rican composer of 4 symphonies
Takashi Yoshimatsu (born 1953), Japanese composer of 6 symphonies
Chen Yi (born 1953), Chinese composer of 3 symphonies
Elisabetta Brusa (born 1954), Italian composer of 2 symphonies
Daniel Bukvich (born 1954), American composer of 2 symphonies
Robert Carl (born 1954), American composer of 3 symphonies
Michael Daugherty (born 1954), American composer of a Metropolis Symphony (1988–93)
Eric Ewazen (born 1954), American composer of 1 symphony for strings and 1 chamber symphony
Anders Nilsson (born 1954), Swedish composer of 3 symphonies
Tobias Picker (born 1954), American composer of 3 symphonies
Sergio Rendine (born 1954), Italian composer of 2 symphonies
Sinan Savaskan (born 1954), British composer of 4 symphonies
Neil Slade (born 1954), American composer of 1 symphony
Carl Vine (born 1954), Australian composer of 8 symphonies
Ye Xiaogang (born 1955), Chinese composer of 1 symphony
Nigel Keay (born 1955), New Zealand composer of 1 symphony
Dieter Lehnhoff (born 1955), German-Guatemalan composer of 2 symphonies
Behzad Ranjbaran (born 1955), Persian–American composer of 1 symphony
Sally Beamish (born 1956), British composer of 2 symphonies
Richard Danielpour (born 1956), American composer of 3 symphonies
Jouni Kaipainen (1956–2015), Finnish composer of 4 symphonies
Onutė Narbutaitė (born 1956), Lithuanian composer of 4 symphonies
Thomas Sleeper (born 1956), American composer of 5 symphonies
Guan Xia (born 1957), Chinese composer of 2 symphonies
Miguel del Águila (born 1957), Uruguayan-American composer 2 programmatic Symphonies
Mark Alburger (born 1957), American composer of 9 symphonies
Keith Burstein (born 1957), English composer of 1 symphony and 1 chamber symphony
Tan Dun (born 1957), Chinese composer of 1 symphony
Andrew Hugill (born 1957), British composer of 2 symphonies
Bechara El Khoury (born 1957), Lebanese-born French composer of 1 symphony
Gerhard Schedl (1957–2000), Austrian composer of 4 symphonies
Frank Ticheli (born 1958), American composer of 2 symphonies
Patrick Hawes (born 1958), British composer of 1 symphony
John Abram (born 1959), Anglo-Canadian composer of 1 chamber symphony
Luc Brewaeys (1959–2015), Belgian composer of 8 symphonies (the last was unfinished)
Alejandro Civilotti (born 1959), Argentine composer of 5 symphonies
Matthew Curtis (born 1959), British composer of 1 symphony
Paul Desenne (born 1959), Venezuelan composer of 5 symphonies
Shigeru Kan-no (born 1959), Japanese composer of 7 chamber symphonies
James MacMillan (born 1959), Scottish composer of 5 symphonies and 1 sinfonietta
Erkki-Sven Tüür (born 1959), Estonian composer of 9 symphonies
Detlev Glanert (born 1960), German composer of 3 symphonies and 1 chamber symphony
Kamran Ince (born 1960), American composer of 5 symphonies
Aaron Jay Kernis (born 1960), American composer of 3 symphonies
Peter Seabourne (born 1960), British composer of 5 symphonies
Jesús Rueda (born 1961), Spanish composer of 9 symphonies
Nicolas Bacri (born 1961), French composer of 7 symphonies
Daron Hagen (born 1961), American composer of 5 symphonies
Lowell Liebermann (born 1961), American composer of 4 symphonies, the second with chorus to texts by Walt Whitman
Michael Torke (born 1961), American composer of 1 symphony
Andrew Glover (born 1962), English composer of 2 symphonies
Claus-Steffen Mahnkopf (born 1962), German composer of 3 chamber symphonies 
Victoria Poleva (born 1962), Ukrainian composer of 3 symphonies
Rudi Spring (born 1962), German composer of 3 chamber symphonies
Timothy Brock (born 1963), American composer of 3 symphonies
Thomas Larcher (born 1963), Austrian composer of 3 symphonies
Sean O'Boyle (born 1963), Australian composer of 1 symphony
John Pickard (born 1963), British composer of 6 symphonies
David del Puerto (born 1964), Spanish composer of 2 symphonies
Julia Gomelskaya (1964–2016), Ukrainian composer of 4 symphonies plus a Concert–Symphony for violin and orchestra and 2 chamber symphonies
Matthew Taylor (born 1964), English composer of 6 symphonies
Robert Steadman (born 1965), British composer of 2 symphonies and 1 chamber symphony
Jeffrey Ching (born 1965), Chinese-Philippine composer of 5 symphonies
Moritz Eggert (born 1965), German composer of 2 symphonies (Symphonie 1.0 for 12 typewriters and Internet–Symphonie for orchestra)
Thierry Pécou (born 1965), French composer of 1 symphony
Vache Sharafyan (born 1966), Armenian composer of 2 symphonies
Julian Anderson (born 1967), British composer of 1 symphony
Salvatore Di Vittorio (born 1967), Italian composer of 3 symphonies
Frederick Stocken (born 1967), British composer of 2 symphonies
Christopher Theofanidis (born 1967), American composer of 1 symphony
Matthew Hindson (born 1968), Australian composer of 3 symphonies
Victoria Borisova-Ollas (born 1969), Russian-Swedish composer of 2 symphonies
Esteban Benzecry (born 1970), Argentine composer of 3 symphonies
Peter Boyer (born 1970), American composer of 1 symphony
Robert Paterson (born 1970), American composer of a Symphony in Three Movements
Fazıl Say (born 1970), Turkish composer of 4 symphonies.
Julian Wagstaff (born 1970), Scottish composer of Symphony for Chamber Orchestra
Thomas Adès (born 1971), British composer of 1 symphony
Michael Hersch (born 1971), American composer of 3 symphonies
Michael Wolters (born 1971), British composer of 1 symphony
Jason Wright Wingate (born 1971), American composer of 2 symphonies
Kevin Puts (born 1972), American composer of 4 symphonies
James Eakin III (born 1973), American composer of 1 Symphony, “Cloud Scraper: Symphony Americana”
Lera Auerbach (born 1973), Russian-American composer of 4 symphonies
Søren Nils Eichberg (born 1973), Danish–German composer of 3 symphonies
Jonathan Leshnoff (born 1973), American composer of 4 symphonies
Airat Ichmouratov (born 1973), Russian/Canadian composer of 1 symphony
Paul Mealor (born 1975), Welsh composer of 3 symphonies
Huw Watkins (born 1976), Welsh composer of 2 symphonies
Mason Bates (born 1977), American composer of 4 symphonies 
Dinesh Subasinghe (born 1979), Sri Lankan composer of 1 symphony
Edward Manukyan (born 1981), Armenian-American composer of 1 symphony
Joel Thomas Zimmerman (born 1981), Canadian composer of 1 symphony
Carson Cooman (born 1982), American composer of 4 symphonies
Mohammed Fairouz (born 1985), American composer of 4 symphonies
Jay Greenberg (born 1991), American composer of 6 symphonies
Alex Prior (born 1992), British composer of 4 symphonies

References